= List of public transport smart cards =

The following tables list smart cards used for public transport and other electronic purse applications.

Defunct smart cards

== Africa ==
Country	Region(s)	Name of Card	Provider	Date of Introduction
Benin	Cotonou	Kinvi Card	Usayi Technology Co,	2018 (January)
Egypt	Cairo	Cash Wallet	?	?
Morocco	Casablanca	Irtiyah	Tramway	2011 (November)
Morocco	Rabat	Irtiyah	Tramway	2011 (November)
Nigeria	Lagos	Cowry	TouchAndPay Technologies Ltd	2020 (August)
Rwanda	Whole country	Tap&Go	AC Group/Asis	?
Senegal	Dakar	Sama TER	SETER (Société d’Exploitation du Train Express Régional)	2021
Senegal	Dakar	CSC (Carte Sans Contact)	Dakar Mobilité for Sunu BRT	2024
South Africa	Whole country	Tap-I-Fare (MasterCard PayPass)	Integrated Fare Collection Services (Pty) Ltd and local Mini-bus taxi companies	2012 (launched 1 February with Peninsula Taxi Association in the Western Cape)
South Africa	Cape Town	MyConnect (MasterCard PayPass) Golden Arrow Gold Card	MyCiti, Golden Arrow Bus Services	2011, 2018
South Africa	Durban	Muvo (MasterCard PayPass)	eThekwini Transport Authority with Standard Bank of South Africa	2012
South Africa	Johannesburg	Gautrain Gold	Gautrain	2010
South Africa	Pretoria	Gautrain Gold	Gautrain	2010

== Americas ==
Country	Region(s)	Name of Card	Provider	Date of Introduction
Argentina	Many cities of the country	SUBE	Nación Servicios S.A	2009
Argentina	Buenos Aires	Monedero	Metrovías	2002–2012
Argentina	Córdoba	Red Bus (Córdoba)	Red Bus (Córdoba)	1992
Argentina	Bahía Blanca	Urbana	EYCON S.A.	2010 (Replaced by SUBE)
Argentina	Mendoza	Red Bus	Red Bus (Mendoza)	2006–2019 (Replaced by SUBE)
Argentina	Rosario	Movi	Municipalidad de Rosario	2011-2023 (Replaced by SUBE)
Argentina	Salta	SAETA	SAETA	2013
Bolivia	La Paz	Tarjeta General, Tarjeta Preferencial, Tarjeta Estudiantil	Mi Teleférico	
Brazil	Belo Horizonte	BHBus	Transfácil	2008
Brazil	Ribeirão das Neves	Ótimo	DER	2000
Brazil	Florianópolis	Passe Rápido	SETUF	2003
Brazil	Fortaleza	Bilhete Único	Etufor	2013
Brazil	Joinville	Cartão Ideal	Passebus	2009
Brazil	Porto Alegre	TRI	ATP	2007
Brazil	Recife	Vem (Vale Eletrônico Metropolitano)	Grande Recife Consórcio de Transporte Metropolitano	2009
Brazil	Rio de Janeiro	RioCard	Fetranspor	2005
Brazil	São Paulo	Bilhete Único	SPTrans – São Paulo Transportes	2004
Brazil	São Paulo	BOM Card	EMTU	1998
Canada	Amherst Island	Ferry Transit Card	Amherst Island Ferry	5 January 2026
Canada	Banff	Roam Smart Card	Roam Transit	
Canada	Belleville	BTAP card	Belleville Transit	29 October 2024
Canada	Bracebridge	waveCARD	Bracebridge Transit	10 November 2025
Canada	Bracebridge	easyPASS	Bracebridge Transit	10 November 2025
Canada	Brandon	SMART Card	Brandon Transit	
Canada	Brantford	B-Card	Brantford Transit	December 2007 (replaced by BT Connect)
Canada	Brantford	BT Connect	Brantford Transit	2 June 2025
Canada	British Columbia	Umo	BC Transit	23 August 2023
Canada	Cape Breton	Umo	Transit Cape Breton	15 June 2026
Canada	Chatham-Kent	Ride CK Smart Card	Ride CK	2016
Canada	Clearview	Clearview Transit Card	Clearview Public Transit	26 October 2021
Canada	Cobourg	Cobourg Transit Smart Card	Cobourg Transit	16 December 2021
Canada	Corner Brook	Transit M-Card	Corner Brook Transit	
Canada	Cornwall	UseTransit	Cornwall Transit	26 October 2022
Canada	Drummondville	Carte Rechargeable	Drummondville Transit	1 February 2025
Canada	Edmonton Metropolitan Region	Arc card	Beaumont Transit, Edmonton Transit Service, Fort Sask Transit, Leduc Transit, St. Albert Transit, Strathcona County Transit, and Spruce Grove Transit	Summer 2021 (pilot) 2022 (full rollout)
Canada	Gaspésie–Îles-de-la-Madeleine	Carte d’accès	RÉGÎM	
Canada	Gatineau	Multi (since 2013; previously called Passe-Partout PLUS)	Société de transport de l'Outaouais	1998
Canada	Gatineau	Transcollines Smart Card	Transcollines	
Canada	Grande Prairie	SUPERPASS	Grande Prairie Transit	2018
Canada	Greater Sudbury	GOVA Pass	GOVA	1 June 2026
Canada	Greater Toronto	PRESTO	Brampton Transit, Burlington Transit, Durham Region Transit, GO Transit, MiWay, Oakville Transit, Toronto Transit Commission, Union Pearson Express, York Region Transit	2007
Canada	Hamilton	PRESTO	Hamilton Street Railway	May 2011
Canada	Ottawa	PRESTO	OC Transpo	May 2013
Canada	Guelph	OnYourWay	Guelph Transit	March 2022
Canada	Happy Valley-Goose Bay	Transit Pass	Happy Valley Goose Bay Transit	11 August 2025
Canada	Kingston	My Card	Kingston Transit	August 2008
Canada	Lethbridge	The Breeze	Lethbridge Transit	December 2011 (replaced by LT Card)
Canada	Lethbridge	LT Card	Lethbridge Transit	July 2023
Canada	London	ALT smart card (Also FANCard and the ONECard Cards)	London Transit	February 2016
Canada	Laval	Opus card	Société de transport de Laval	April 2008
Canada	Lévis	Opus card	Société de transport de Lévis	April 2011
Canada	Longueuil	Opus card	Réseau de transport de Longueuil	Fall 2008
Canada	Montreal	Opus card	Société de transport de Montréal	Fall 2008
Canada	Quebec City	Opus card	Réseau de transport de la Capitale	June 2009
Canada	Medicine Hat	MTHgo!	Medicine Hat Transit	11 October 2022
Canada	Orillia	cOnnect Pass	Orillia Transit	2 January 2022
Canada	Red Deer	MYRide Card	Red Deer Transit	2016
Canada	Regina	R-Card	Regina Transit	1 November 2010 (replaced by Umo)
Canada	Regina	Umo	Regina Transit	13 August 2024
Canada	Saint-Hyacinthe	Matawan Card	Les Promenades de L'Estrie	2022
Canada	Sarnia	Transit Smart Card	Sarnia Transit	21 July 2021
Canada	Saskatoon	Go-Pass	Saskatoon Transit	1 February 2010
Canada	Sault Ste. Marie	Umo	Sault Ste. Marie Transit Services	June 2023
Canada	Sherbrooke	Le porte-monnaie électronique	Société de transport de Sherbrooke	
Canada	Simcoe County	easyPASS	Argo Corporation (BWG Transit)	1 May 2014
Canada	Simcoe County	LINX Card	LINX Transit	7 August 2018
Canada	Simcoe County	Mid-Pen Smart Card	Mid-Pen Transit	
Canada	St. John's	m-Card	St. John's Transportation Commission (Metrobus)	December 2006
Canada	Thunder Bay	Lift Pass	Thunder Bay Transit	24 March 2025
Canada	Timmins	Pay Your Way	Timmins Transit	6 January 2025
Canada	Vancouver	Compass	TransLink (South Coast British Columbia Transportation Authority) (Cubic)	September 2013 (beta); August 2015 (public)
Canada	Waterloo Region	EasyGO	Grand River Transit	February 2018 (beta); March 2019 (public)
Canada	Windsor	TW Smart Ride	Transit Windsor	15 January 2019 (replaced by Umo)
Canada	Windsor	Umo	Transit Windsor	5 October 2026
Canada	Winnipeg	peggo	Winnipeg Transit	4 July 2016
Canada	Woodstock	OneCard	Woodstock Transit	2017
Chile	Antofagasta	Tarjeta Amibus	Red Antofagasta de Movilidad	2025
Chile	Antofagasta	Tarjeta Antofagasta Conectado (Bipay)	TransAntofagasta	2026
Chile	Arica	Kupospay	Transporte Público de Arica	2026
Chile	Chillán	Tarjeta Chillán Conectado (Bipay)	Chillán Conectado	2023
Chile	Concepción	Tarjeta Biotren	Biotren	2006 (replaced by Conecta)
Chile	Concepción	Tarjeta Conecta	Biotren	2023
Chile	Concepción	Tarjeta Gran Concepción Conectado	TPMC	2026
Chile	Copiapó	Kupospay	Red Copiapó de Movilidad	2025
Chile	Coquimbo-La Serena	Kupospay	Red Coquimbo-La Serena de Movilidad	2024
Chile	Curicó	Kupospay	Transporte Público de Curicó	2026
Chile	Ovalle	Kupospay	Red Ovalle de Movilidad	2026
Chile	Punta Arenas	Tarjeta Punta Arenas Conectado (Bipay)	Red Punta Arenas de Movilidad	2025
Chile	Rancagua	Tarjeta Tren Central	MetroTren Rancagua	2017 (replaced by Conecta)
Chile	Rancagua	Tarjeta Conecta	MetroTren Rancagua	2026
Chile	Rancagua	Tarjeta Bipay	TransO'Higgins	2021
Chile	Santiago	Multivía	Metro de Santiago	2003 (replaced by bip!)
Chile	Santiago	Tarjeta bip!, Pase escolar bip!, TNE, TAM	Transantiago	2007
Chile	Santiago	Tarjeta bip!, Pase escolar bip!, TNE, TAM	Tren Central Alameda-Nos	2017
Chile	Temuco	Tarjeta Temuco Conectado (Bipay)	Temuco Conectado	2025
Chile	Valparaíso	Tarjeta Metroval	Metro Valparaíso, associated funiculars and trolleybuses	2005 (renewed in 2015, replaced by Conecta)
Chile	Valparaíso	Contactless MasterCard	Metro Valparaíso	2018
Chile	Valparaíso	TNE (same plastic as in Santiago, doesn't share money between systems)	Metro Valparaíso	2019
Chile	Valparaíso	Tarjeta Conecta	Metro Valparaíso	2023
Colombia	Bogotá	Tarjeta Cliente Frecuente, Tarjeta Tullave	TransMilenio; SITP	2000 (2012, Tullave)
Colombia	Medellín	Tarjeta Cívica	Metro de Medellín	2006
Colombia	Pereira	MegaTarjeta	Megabús	2006
Colombia	Cali	Tarjeta MIO	Masivo Integrado de Occidente	2009
Colombia	Cartagena	Tarjeta TransCaribe	TransCaribe	2015
Colombia	Barranquilla	Tarjeta Transmetro	Transmetro	2010
Dominican Republic	Santo Domingo	Boleto Viajero/Tarjeta Recargable	OPRET (Oficina Para el Reordenamiento del Transporte)	2009
Dominican Republic	Santo Domingo	SDGo	OPRET, OMSA (Operadora Metropolitana de Servicios de Autobuses)	2020
Greenland	Nuuk	Plastkorti/Plastkort	Nuup Bussii A/S	2016
Mexico	Guadalajara	Tarjeta SITEUR	SITEUR (Sistema de Tren Eléctrico Urbano)	2002
Mexico	Monterrey	Tarjeta FERIA	Enlaces Inteligentes	2010
Mexico	León de los Aldama	PagoBus	Coordinadora Del Transporte Urbano De La Ciudad, S.C.	2001 (March)
Mexico	Mexico City	Seguro Popular	CNPSS	2005
Mexico	Mexico City	Tarjeta Metrobus	Mexico City Metrobús	2005 (Discontinued)
Mexico	Mexico City	Tarjeta DF (later renamed Tarjeta CDMX)	Sistema de Transporte Colectivo	2012 (Discontinued)
Mexico	Mexico City	Tarjeta de Movilidad Integrada (MI)	Secretaría de Movilidad de la Ciudad de México	2019 (October)
Mexico	Mexico City	Tarjeta del Tren Suburbano	Ferrocarriles Suburbanos, SA de CV	2024
Mexico	State of Mexico	Mexipase	Sistema de Transporte Masivo y Teleférico	2020
Mexico	State of Mexico	Movimex	Sistema de Transporte Masivo y Teleférico	2024 (October)
Mexico	Mérida	Tarjeta Va y Ven	Gobierno del Estado de Yucatán	27 November 2021
Mexico	Tekax	Tarjeta Va y Ven	Gobierno del Estado de Yucatán	27 November 2021
Mexico	Tizimín	Tarjeta Va y Ven	Gobierno del Estado de Yucatán	27 November 2021
Mexico	Umán	Tarjeta Va y Ven	Gobierno del Estado de Yucatán	27 November 2021
Mexico	Valladolid	Tarjeta Va y Ven	Gobierno del Estado de Yucatán	27 November 2021
Nicaragua	Managua	Tarjeta TUC	MPeso	2013–2018
Panama	Panama City	Metrobus Card	MiBus	15 February 2012
Paraguay	Asunción	Jaha	Empresa Paraguaya de Servicios S.A.E.	2019
Paraguay	Asunción	Más Tarjeta	TDP S.A.	2019
Peru	Lima	Tarjeta Electrónica Inteligente	El Metropolitano (bus rapid transit)	2010
Peru	Lima	Tarjeta Lima Metro	AATE	2012 (April)
Puerto Rico	San Juan	p’ATI	ATI (Autoridad de Transporte Integrado de Puerto Rico)	2025
United States	Various cities within the Midwest and surrounding states	EZfare Card	Ann Arbor Area Transportation Authority, Butler County Regional Transit Authority, Community Action Rural Transit System (Columbiana County, OH), Greater Cleveland Regional Transit Authority, Greene CATS Public Transit (Greene County, OH), Kanawha Valley Regional Transportation Authority, Laketran (Lake County, OH), Lancaster-Fairfield Public Transit, Medina County Transit, METRO Regional Transit Authority (Akron, OH), Portage Area Regional Transportation Authority, Sandusky Transit System (Erie County, OH), Stark Area Regional Transit Authority (Canton, OH), Southwest Ohio Regional Transit Authority (Cincinnati, OH), Toledo Area Regional Transit Authority, Transit Authority of Northern Kentucky, Greater Lafayette Public Transportation Corporation	2023
United States	Atlanta, GA	Breeze Card	Metropolitan Atlanta Rapid Transit Authority, Ride Gwinnett, Connect Douglas, CobbLinc, GRTA Xpress	2005 (December)
United States	Austin, TX	amp	CapMetro	2023-2025
United States	Austin, TX	CapMetro Reloadable Fare Card	CapMetro	2025
United States	Bellingham, WA	TouchPass/Umo	Whatcom Transit Authority	June 2019
United States	Boston, MA	CharlieCard	Massachusetts Bay Transportation Authority	2006
United States	Buffalo, NY	MetGo	Niagara Frontier Transportation Authority	2023
United States	Canton, OH	SCORE Card	Stark Area Regional Transit Authority	2022 (July 13)
United States	Capital District, NY	Navigator Card	Capital District Transportation Authority	2017
United States	Chicago, IL	Chicago Card	Chicago Transit Authority, Pace	1997 (replaced by Ventra)
United States	Chicago, IL	Ventra	Chicago Transit Authority, Pace	2013
United States	Columbia, SC	COMET Card	Central Midlands Regional Transit Authority	
United States	Columbus, OH	COTA Smartcard	Central Ohio Transit Authority	2021 (October)
United States	Connecticut	Go CT Card	Connecticut Transit	2018
United States	Dallas, TX	GoPass Tap	Dallas Area Rapid Transit	2018
United States	Davenport, IA	CitiBus Smart Card	Davenport Citibus	2017 (July 1)-2023
United States	Dayton, OH	Tapp Pay	Greater Dayton Regional Transit Authority	2021
United States	Denver, CO	MyRide card	Regional Transportation District	2016 (1 January)
United States	Denver, CO	EcoPass card	Regional Transportation District	January 2013
United States	Denver, CO	Neighborhood EcoPass card	Regional Transportation District	January 2013
United States	Denver, CO	CollegePass card	Regional Transportation District	January 2013
United States	Dubuque, IA	Jule Smart Pass	The Jule	2021 (August 23)
United States	Duluth, MN	EZ Card	Duluth Transit Authority	
United States	Elmira, NY	SmartTAP Card	C TRAN	
United States	Eugene, OR	Umo	Lane Transit District	21 October 2019
United States	Fargo, ND	Connect Card	MATBUS	2022 (4 May)
United States	Flint, MI	Go Pass	Mass Transportation Authority	August 2024
United States	Grand Rapids, MI	Wave	The Rapid	August 2018
United States	Honolulu, HI	HOLO card	TheBus, Skyline	2018 (pilot); 2021 (full rollout)
United States	Houston, TX	METRO Q Card	Houston Metro	2007/2008-2026 (April 11)
United States	Houston, TX	RideMETRO Fare Card	Houston Metro	2026 (April 11)
United States	Huntington, WV	Value Card	Tri-State Transit Authority	
United States	Indianapolis, IN	MyKey	IndyGo	Fall 2019
United States	Jacksonville, FL	STAR Card	Jacksonville Transportation Authority	2012
United States	Janesville, WI	MyJTS	Janesville Transit System	
United States	Knoxville, TN	katpay Card	Knoxville Area Transit	2024
United States	Lakeland, FL	SMARTCARD	Citrus Connection	2017 (October)
United States	Lake County, OH	Smart Card	Laketran	2010 (discontinued)
United States	Las Vegas, NV	Tap & GO	RTC Transit	2023
United States	Lee County, FL	TropiCard	LeeTran	2020
United States	Lehigh Valley, PA	ValleyRide	LANta	2025 (July 1)
United States	Los Angeles, CA	TAP card	Los Angeles Metro, LADOT (Dash, Commuter Express), Antelope Valley Transit Authority, Baldwin Park Transit, Beach Cities Transit, Big Blue Bus, Burbank Bus, Carson Circuit Transit System, City of Santa Clarita Transit, Compton Renaissance Transit, Culver CityBus, FlyAway, Foothill Transit, GTrans, Glendale Beeline, Huntington Park COMBI, Long Beach Transit, LACDPW, Montebello Bus Lines, Monterey Park Spirit Bus, Norwalk Transit, Palos Verdes Peninsula Transit Authority, Pasadena Transit, Torrance Transit	2007/2008
United States	Louisville, KY	MyTARC	TARC	2019 (January)
United States	Madison, WI	Metro Fast Fare	Metro Transit	2024 (September)
United States	Maryland and Washington, D.C.	CharmCard	Maryland Transit Administration (MTA) for Baltimore Metro, Baltimore Light Rail, MTA Maryland bus service	2010 (21 September), no longer accepted on MTA or transit in Baltimore after 31 Dec 2025
United States	Maryland and Washington, D.C.	CharmCard	WMATA and other agencies that accept SmarTrip	2010 (21 September), no longer accepted on MTA or transit in Baltimore after 31 Dec 2025
United States	Memphis, TN	Go901	Memphis Area Transit Authority	2023 (August)
United States	Miami metropolitan area, FL	EASY Card	Miami-Dade Transit, SFRTA/Tri-Rail	2009 (August; MDT), 2011 (February; SFRTA/Tri-Rail)
United States	Milwaukee County, WI	M-Card	Milwaukee County Transit System	Intro 2014 (29 Sep); Defunct 2023 (1 Oct)
United States	Milwaukee County, WI	WisGo! card	Milwaukee County Transit System	2023 (1 April)
United States	Minneapolis–Saint Paul, MN & WI	Go-To card	Metro Transit (Minnesota)	2007 (April)
United States	Monterey, CA	GoCard	Monterey Salinas Transit	2011
United States	Nashville, TN	QuickTicket	WeGo Public Transit	2022
United States	New Jersey	FARE-PAY	NJ Transit	2025 (April 19); buses and light rail only, initially
United States	New York City, NY and Northern New Jersey	SmartLink	PATH	2007 (2 July)
United States	New York City, NY and Northern New Jersey	TAPP Card	PATH	2025 (4 December)
United States	New York City, NY	OMNY	Metropolitan Transportation Authority	2019 (May)
United States	Omaha, NE	Umo	Metro Transit	2021 (1 October)
United States	Orange County, CA	Wave	OCTA	2025 (15 October)
United States	Orlando, FL	SunCard	SunRail, Votran (future), Lynx (Orlando) (in implementation)	2014 (SunRail)
United States	Palm Beach County, FL	Paradise Pass	PalmTran	2021 (November)
United States	Philadelphia, PA	SEPTA Key	SEPTA	2016
United States	Philadelphia, PA and South Jersey	FREEDOM	PATCO	2008 (conversion completed)
United States	Phoenix, AZ	Platinum Pass	Valley Metro	2011–2024 (were available and sold to area employers for distribution to employees)
United States	Phoenix, AZ	Copper Card	Valley Metro	19 August 2024
United States	Pittsburgh, PA	ConnectCard	Pittsburgh Regional Transit, Fayette Area Coordinated Transportation, Butler Transit Authority, Mid Mon Valley Transit Authority, Freedom Transit (Washington County, Pennsylvania), Westmoreland County Transit Authority	2012
United States	Portland, ME	DiriGo TouchPass	Greater Portland Metro, BSOOB Transit, City of South Portland Bus Service	2020
United States	Portland, OR	Hop Fastpass	TriMet, Portland Streetcar, C-TRAN	2017
United States	Raleigh, NC	GoCard	GoRaleigh	
United States	Raleigh, NC	GoPass Umo	GoRaleigh, GoTriangle	2024
United States	Rochester, NY	RTS Go	Rochester-Genesee Regional Transportation Authority	2020 (15 July)
United States	Rhode Island	Wave	RIPTA	2020 (September)
United States	Sacramento, CA	Connect Card	Sacramento Area Council of Governments (SACOG)	2017
United States	Saint Cloud, MN	Smart Ride Card	Saint Cloud Metro Bus	2021 (1 October)
United States	Saint Louis, MO	Gateway Card	Metro Transit (St. Louis)	Intro 2018; Defunct 2025 (31 Dec)
United States	San Antonio, TX	goCard	VIA Metropolitan Transit	2019
United States	Salt Lake City, UT	Farepay	Utah Transit Authority	2015
United States	San Francisco Bay Area, CA	Clipper	AC Transit, BART, Caltrain, County Connection, Golden Gate Bridge, Golden Gate Bridge, Highway and Transportation District (Golden Gate Transit and Golden Gate Ferry), Marin Transit, Petaluma Transit, SamTrans, Muni, VTA, Santa Rosa CityBus, San Francisco Bay Ferry, Sonoma County Transit, Tri-Delta Transit, VINE, WestCAT, WHEELS, SolTrans, FAST, Union City Transit, Vacaville City Coach, Sonoma–Marin Area Rail Transit (SMART)	2008 (testing since 2002, partial launch 2007, in use 2008); Formerly named TransLink.
United States	San Diego, CA	Compass Card	SANDAG, San Diego Metropolitan Transit System, North County Transit District	2009–2021 (now defunct)
United States	San Diego, CA	PRONTO	San Diego Metropolitan Transit System, North County Transit District	2021 (1 September)
United States	Santa Cruz, CA	CruzCash	Santa Cruz Metro	
United States	Seattle metropolitan area, WA	ORCA card	Sound Transit, King County Metro, Pierce Transit, Community Transit, Seattle Streetcar, Washington State Ferries, Everett Transit, Kitsap Transit, King County Water Taxi, Seattle Center Monorail	2009
United States	Skagit County, WA	TouchPass	Skagit Transit	13 January 2020 (internal testing)
United States	Spokane, WA	Connect card	Spokane Transit Authority	2022. Formerly Smart Card from 2009 to 2022
United States	Springfield, IL	BusTap card	Sangamon Mass Transit District	
United States	Tampa Bay metropolitan area, FL	Flamingo Fares	Hillsborough Area Regional Transit, THE Bus, Pasco County Public Transportation, Pinellas Suncoast Transit Authority, Sarasota County Area Transit	2018 (test phase), in use 2021
United States	Treasure Valley, ID	City Go Card	Valley Regional Transit (bus rapid transit)	2021 (November)
United States	Tucson, AZ	SunGO	Sun Tran	2013 (30 June) (Discontinued)
United States	Ventura County, CA	Go Ventura Smartcard	Gold Coast Transit	2001 (December) (now defunct)
United States	Ventura County, CA	VCbuspass	Ventura County Transportation Commission	2021 (October)
United States	Washington, D.C.	SmarTrip	WMATA, DC Circulator (defunct), Arlington Transit, CUE (fare-free), DASH (fare-free), Fairfax Connector, LC Transit, OmniRide, Ride On (fare-free), TheBus (fare-free)	1999, no longer accepted on MTA or transit in Baltimore after 31 Dec 2025
United States	Washington, D.C.	SmarTrip	Baltimore Metro, Baltimore Light Rail, MTA Maryland bus service	1999, no longer accepted on MTA or transit in Baltimore after 31 Dec 2025
United States	Wisconsin	WisGo/Umo	Milwaukee County Transit System, Beloit Transit, GO Transit (Oshkosh), RYDE Racine, Valley Transit (Appleton/Fox Cities), Waukesha Metro Transit	April 2023, other agencies adopted later
Uruguay	Metropolitan Area (Montevideo, Canelones and San José)	es:Sistema de Transporte Metropolitano	Intendency of Montevideo	2007

== Asia and Oceania ==
Country	Region(s)	Name of Card	Provider	Date of Introduction
Australia	Adelaide	Metrocard	Adelaide Metro (ACS)	24 October 2011 (First equipment installation)
Australia	South East Queensland	go card	Translink (Cubic)	29 January 2008 / 25 February 2008 (network-wide)
Australia	Canberra	MyWay+	Transport for Canberra (Parkeon / Downer EDi)	27 November 2024
Australia	Northern Territory	Tap and Ride Card	Darwin Bus/ASbus	Dec 2014 (Darwin, Alice Springs)
Australia	Perth	SmartRider	Transperth (Parkeon / Downer EDi)	14 January 2007
Australia	Sydney, Central Coast, Hunter, Newcastle, Illawarra, Wollongong and Southern Highlands	Opal	Transport for NSW (Pearl Consortium/Cubic)	7 December 2012 (Ferries), 14 June 2013 (Trains), 30 September 2013 (Buses), 1 December 2014 (Light Rail)
Australia	Tasmania	Multirider Smartcard	Tassielink	Merged into Greencard and no longer available
Australia	Tasmania	Greencard	Metro Tasmania (INIT)	May 2009 (Burnie), 16 Sept 2009 (Hobart)
Australia	Victoria	myki	Public Transport Victoria (NTT DATA)	12 December 2008: trial on four Geelong bus routes. March–May 2009: introduced on major regional city bus services. 29 December 2009: valid for travel in Melbourne. 29 December 2012: metropolitan roll-out complete. June/July 2013: became valid for travel on regional "commuter" train services. September 2026: became vaild on all regional trains
Azerbaijan	Baku	BakıKART	Baku Metro	August 2015
Bangladesh	Dhaka	Rapid Pass	Dhaka Transport Coordination Authority	4 January 2018
Bahrain	Whole Country	Go Card	Bahrain Bus	2015
China	Whole Country (336 cities as of Dec 2023)	China T-Union	Ministry of Transport	29 June 2015
China	Beijing	BMACC / Yikatong	Beijing Municipal Administration and Communications Card Company, Limited	2003
China	Changsha	Xiaoxiang Card	Hunan Xiaoxiang One Card Technology Co.	September 2018
China	Chengdu	Tianfutong Card	Tianfutong Company	2012
China	Chongqing	Yiju Changtong	Chongqing Municipal Government	2003
China	Dalian	Pearl Card	Dalian Pearl Public Card Co.	September 2018
China	Fuzhou	Yikatong Fuzhou	Fuzhou Public Transport	sometime between 2006 and 2008
China	Pearl River Delta; Guangzhou, Foshan, Zhaoqing, Jiangmen, Shanwei, & Huizhou	Lingnan Tong: Yang Cheng Tong; Guangfo Tong; Wuyi Tong; Honghai Tong; Huizhou Tong	Yang Cheng Tong Corporation; Guangfo Tong Corporation; Wuyi Tong Corporation; Honghai Tong Corporation; Huizhou Tong Corporation	December 2001
China	Hangzhou	Hangzhou Multifunction Card	Hangzhou Citizen Card Co., Ltd	October 2012
China	Jinan	Quanchengtong Transportation Union Card	Jinan Public Transport Group	
China	Minnan Delta; Xiamen, Zhangzhou, Quanzhou & Longyan	E-Tong Card	Xiamen E-Card Operations, Limited	
China	Nanjing	Jinlingtong	Nanjing Citizen Card Co., Limited	
China	Shanghai	CPTC / Jiaotong Yikatong	Shanghai Public Transportation Card Company, Limited	December 1999
China	Shenyang	Chengshitong	Shenyang City Link Network Co., Limited	2003
China	Dalian	Mingzhu Card/ Pearl Card	Dalian Mingzhu Card Operations Co., ltd	Company Founded in March 2001 Services Started on 15 July 2001
China	Shenzhen	Shenzhen Tong	Shenzhen TransCard Corporation	December 2004
China	Suzhou	Suzhou Tong	Suzhou Civic Information Construction Co., Limited	1 November 2003
China	Tianjin	Tianjin City Card	Tianjin Metropolitan Card Company, Limited	June 2006
China	Wenzhou	Wenzhou Citizen Card	Wenzhou City Card Service Co., Ltd	
China	Wuhan	Wuhan City Smart Card	Wuhan City Card Company, Limited	February 2009
China	Wuxi	Wuxi Citizen Card	Wuxi Citizen Card Co.	September 2002
China	Xi'an	Changantong	Xi'an City One-Card Co.	December 2018
China	Zhengzhou	Greentown Pass	Zhengzhou City Card Co.	September 2012
Fiji	Whole area	eTransport	Vodafone	1 October 2017
Hong Kong	Whole area	Octopus	Octopus Cards Limited	September 1997
Macau	Whole area	Macau Pass	Transmac (1999-August 2006)	March 1999
Macau	Macau Light Rapid Transit	LRT Card	Macau Light Rail Transit Company, Ltd.	December 2019
India	Only few major cities in different states	More Card	Government of India	2011
India	Only few major cities in different states	National Common Mobility Card	National Payments Corporation of India	4 March 2019
India	New Delhi	Delhi Metro Smart Card	Delhi Metro Rail Corporation	2005
India	Bangalore	Namma Metro Smart Card	Bangalore Metro Rail Corporation Ltd. (BMRC)	2011
India	Chennai	Chennai Metro Smart Card	Chennai Metro Rail Ltd. (CMRL)	2015
India	Jaipur	Jaipur Metro Smart Card	Jaipur Metro Rail Corporation Ltd.	2017
India	Kolkata	Kolkata Metro Smart Card	Kolkata Metro Rail Corporation	2011
India	Mumbai	Bus Pass Smart Card	BEST (BrihanMumbai Electric Supply & Transport Undertaking)	2007
India	Mumbai	Mumbai Suburban Railway	Indian Railways	2007
India	Mumbai	Mumbai Metro	Mumbai Metro	2014
India	Mumbai	Mumbai Monorail	MMRDA	2014
India	Hyderabad	Nebula Metro Smart Card	L&T Metro Rail Hyderabad Ltd. (LTMRHL)	2017
Indonesia	Whole country	BRIZZI	Bank BRI	
Indonesia	Whole country	Flazz	Bank BCA	2007
Indonesia	Whole country	Mandiri e-Money	Bank Mandiri	
Indonesia	Whole country	TAP-CASH	Bank BNI	
Indonesia	Whole country	Jak Lingko	PT Jakarta Lingko Indonesia	2017
Indonesia	Bandung	Bandung Smart Card	Bandung city government, Bank BJB	2018 (discontinued)
Indonesia	Greater Jakarta	JakCard	Bank Jakarta	2010
Indonesia	Greater Jakarta	KMT	KAI Commuter	2013
Indonesia	Greater Jakarta	Jelajah Card	Jakarta MRT	2019 (discontinued)
Indonesia	Greater Medan	Sumut Card	Bank Sumut (defunct), Bank BRI	2020
Indonesia	Palembang	Trans Musi Smart Card	Trans Musi	2011 (discontinued)
Iran	Tehran	Metro Card	Processing World Co. with ASCOM	Implemented in 2002
Iran	Mashhad	Tarashe Mashhad	Tarashe Vira (/Tarashe Vira)	2010
Iran	Tehran	Tarashe Tehran	Tarashe Vira (Tarashe Vira)	2008
Iran	Isfahan	Isfahan Transport Electronic Card	Isfahan Bus	September 2010
Iran	Shahinshahr	Shahin Shahr Card	Shahinshahr Bus	
Israel	Whole country	Rav-Kav	Transportation Ministry of Israel	August 2007
Japan	Whole country	Edy	Rakuten	November 2001
Japan	Whole country	Paseli	Konami Arcade Games	April 2008
Japan	Whole country	nanaco	Seven & I Holdings	April 2007
Japan	Whole country	taspo	Tobacco Institute of Japan and others	July 2008. Operation ceased on March 31, 2026.
Japan	Whole country	Waon	ÆON	April 2007
Japan	Majority of the country	Nationwide Mutual Usage Service	Ministry of Land, Infrastructure, Transport and Tourism	23 March 2013
Japan	Asahikawa	Do Card	Dōhoku Bus	November 1999
Japan	Fukuoka Prefecture	Hayakaken	Fukuoka City Transportation Bureau	March 2009
Japan	Fukuoka Prefecture	nimoca	Nishi-Nippon Railroad	May 2008
Japan	Fukuoka Prefecture	SUGOCA	JR Kyushu	March 2009
Japan	Gifu	ayuca	Gifu Bus	December 2006
Japan	Hamamatsu	NicePass	Enshū Railway	October 2004
Japan	Hiroshima	Skyrail IC Card	Skyrail Service	August 1998. Skyrail ceased operation on April 30, 2024
Japan	Hiroshima	PASPY	Hiroshima Electric Railway and other 14 operators	January 2008. PASPY ended service on March 29, 2025
Japan	Hyōgo, Osaka and Okayama Prefectures	NicoPa	Shinki Bus	January 2006
Japan	Itami	Itappy	Itami City Transportation Bureau	April 2008
Japan	Kagoshima	Iwasaki IC Card	Iwasaki Corporation Group	April 2005
Japan	Kagoshima	RapiCa	Kagoshima City Transportation Bureau, Nangoku Kōtsū, and JR Kyūshū Bus	April 2005
Japan	Kanazawa	ICa	Hokuriku Railroad	December 2004
Japan	Kōchi Prefecture	DESUCA	Tosa Electric Railway and 4 bus operators	January 2009
Japan	Fukushima	noruca	Fukushima Kōtsū	October 2010
Japan	Kumamoto	Kumamon's IC Card^{[ja]}	Kumamoto Electric Railway and 4 bus operators	April 2015
Japan	Matsuyama	IC e-card	Iyo Railway (Iyotetsu)	October 2005. Ended service on September 30, 2025
Japan	Greater Nagoya and Shizuoka Prefecture	TOICA	JR Central	November 2006
Japan	Greater Nagoya	manaca	Transportation Bureau City of Nagoya, Meitetsu, and 3 other operators	March 2011
Japan	Nara Prefecture	CI-CA	Nara Kōtsū Bus Line	December 2004
Japan	Okayama	Hareca	Okayama Electric Tramway, Ryōbi Bus, Shimotsui Dentetsu	October 2006
Japan	Okinawa	OKICA	Okinawa Urban Monorail, Naha Bus, Ryukyu Bus Kotsu, Okinawa Bus, Toyo Bus, N Bus	October 2014
Japan	Greater Osaka, Okayama and Hiroshima Prefectures	ICOCA	JR West	November 2003
Japan	Greater Osaka, Okayama and Shizuoka	PiTaPa	Surutto Kansai Association, composed of various private operators	October 2004
Japan	Sapporo	Kitaca	JR Hokkaido	October 2008
Japan	Sapporo	SAPICA	Sapporo City Transportation Bureau	January 2009
Japan	Sendai	icsca	Sendai City Transportation Bureau	December 2014
Japan	Shizuoka	LuLuCa	Shizuoka Railway and Shizutetsu Just Line	March 2006
Japan	Takamatsu	IruCa	Takamatsu-Kotohira Electric Railroad and Kotoden Bus	February 2005
Japan	Greater Tokyo Area	Pasmo	Pasmo Corporation, associated with various private operators	March 2007
Japan	Greater Tokyo Area, Sendai and Niigata	Suica	JR East and 5 other operators	November 2001
Japan	Toyama	ecomyca	Toyama Chihō Railway	February 2010
Japan	Toyama	passca	Toyama Light Rail	April 2006. Passes no longer issued as of February 2020.
Jordan	Amman	eKartak	Kentkart	September 2008
Kazakhstan	Almaty, Karaganda, Saran, Balkhash, Temirtau, Taldykorgan	Onay	The City of Almaty Transport Holdings	October 2015
Kazakhstan	Astana	Transcard	City Transportation Systems LLP	
Kazakhstan	Taraz	Tulpar		
Kazakhstan	Shymkent	Tolem		
Kyrgyzstan	Bishkek	Tulpar		
Kuwait	Kuwait	Bus Pass	Kuwait Citybus	
Malaysia	Whole country	Touch 'n Go	Touch n Go Sdn Bhd	1997
Malaysia	Klang Valley	My Rapid Touch 'n Go	Rapid KL	June 2017
Malaysia	Klang Valley, Negeri Sembilan and Tanjong Malim, Perak	Komuterlink	KTM Komuter	2016
Malaysia	Johor Bahru, Johor	Manjalink	Causeway Link	2011
Malaysia	Penang	Pas Mutiara	Rapid Penang & Rapid Ferry	September 2019
New Zealand	Auckland	AT HOP card/Contactless Payments	Auckland Transport	8 May 2011, October 2012 (AT HOP Card)
New Zealand	Bee Card consortium	Bee Card		Bay of Plenty, Hawke's Bay, Manawatū-Whanganui, Nelson, Northland, Otago, Southland, Taranaki, Waikato in 2019 to 2020
New Zealand	Christchurch	Contactless payments/Motu Move	Environment Canterbury (INIT)	2004
New Zealand	Hamilton	BUSIT! Card	Environment Waikato	2003, discontinued and replaced by Bee Card from 1 July 2020
New Zealand	Hutt Valley	GoRider	Cityline Hutt Valley	Discontinued June 2009, replaced by regional Snapper card, including transfer of balance.
New Zealand	Wellington	Snapper card	Infratil/NZ Bus	June 2008
New Zealand	Greater Wellington	Travelcard	Newlands/Mana Coach Services	2002, discontinued and replaced by Snapper
New Zealand	Dunedin & Queenstown	GO Card	Otago Regional Council	2007 in Dunedin, 2010 in Queenstown. The Bee Card replaced the GoCard in Dunedin on 1 September and in Queenstown on 15 September 2020.
Pakistan	Lahore	Metrobus Cards	Kentkart	2012
Philippines	Whole country	Beep	AF Payments, Inc.	July 2015
Philippines	Whole country	TRIPKO	Journeytech, Inc.	
Philippines	Luzon	BeepRides	GYRFALCON Corporation	2019
Qatar	Whole country	Karwa SmartCard	Mowasalat Karwa	2007
Qatar	Doha	Travel Card	Qatar Rail	May 2019 for Doha Metro and Metrolink feeder services, January 2022 for Lusail Tram
Russia	Chelyabinsk	Uralinfotect	CFT	2004
Russia	Chuvashia	United Transport Card of Chuvashia	Chuvashia government	1 June 2008
Russia	Kazan	Transport Card	Kazan City Authority	
Russia	Kemerovo	Electronic pass	Kemerovo transit	20 Jan 2010
Russia	Lipetsk	Lipetsk Transport System united transport card	Lipetsk Transport	1 Jan 2010
Russia	Moscow	Troika	Moscow Metro and Mosgortrans	2 April 2013
Russia	Moscow	Transport Card	Moscow Metro	1 September 1998
Russia	Moscow	Transport Card	Mosgortrans	Introduced on 12 May 2001. Fully implemented on all routes in April 2006. 3 of 689 routes now working without turnstiles.
Russia	Nizhny Novgorod	Autochip petroil smart card	Autocard	1998
Russia	Novgorod	Beresta	T-Karta	June 2018
Russia	Novosibirsk	Transport card	CFT	2006
Russia	Orenburg	United transport card	Orenburg transport	1 Oct 2007
Russia	Ryazan	UmKA		2013
Russia	Saint Petersburg	Podorozhnik	Saint Petersburg Metro	2004
Russia	Samara	Transport card – Samara	Samara transit	2008 or 2009
Russia	Yekaterinburg	EKARTA		2009
Saudi Arabia	Most Cities	Urban Card	SAPTCO	
Saudi Arabia	Riyadh	Darb	Riyadh Bus, Riyadh Metro	2023
Saudi Arabia	Mecca	Yamam	Makkah Bus	2023
Singapore	Whole country	CEPAS-EZ-Link	EZ-Link Pte Ltd	February 2009
South Korea	Whole country	hi-pass plus	Korea Expressway Corporation	2000
South Korea	Almost whole country	T-money	T-money	July 2004
South Korea	Almost whole country	CashBee	EZL	December 2010
South Korea	Almost whole country	payOn	BC Card, KB Kookmin Card, Shinhan Card, Hana Card, Nonghyup Bank, Lotte Card, Hyundai Card, Samsung Card, Citibank Korea, Jeonbuk Bank, Gwangju Bank, Jeju bank etc.	1998
South Korea	Busan	Hanaro Card	Mybi	1997
South Korea	Daegu	Daegyeong Traffic card	Kardnet	2000
South Korea	Daejeon	Hankkumi Card^{[ko]}	Hana Bank & T-Money	2003
South Korea	Seoul Metropolitan Area	Upass	Seoul Bus Transport Association	June 1996, first in the world
South Korea	Seoul Metropolitan Area	eB Card (eB T-money, eB Upass)	eB	2001
Sri Lanka	Colombo	Driving Licence	Department of Motor Traffic	2009
Syria	Aleppo	Aleppo City Card	Kentkart	December 2008
Taiwan	Whole country	iPASS	I-Pass Corporation	December 2007
Taiwan	Whole country	EasyCard	EasyCard Corporation	March 2000
Taiwan	Whole country	icash 2.0	icash Co., Ltd.	October 2014
Taiwan	Whole country	HappyCash	Yuan Hsin Digital Payment Co., Ltd.	2014 (defunct in 2022)
Thailand	Whole country	Rabbit Card	Bangkok Smartcard System Limited	2012
Thailand	Whole country	Smart Purse	Thai Smart Card Co., Ltd.	December 2005
Thailand	Bangkok	Bangkok Metro Smart card	Bangkok Metro	2004
Thailand	Bangkok	BTS Smart pass	Bangkok Skytrain	2006
Thailand	Bangkok	Be1st BTS Card	Bangkok Bank	2007
Thailand	Bangkok	Mangmoom Card	Mangmoom Card Limited	June 2018
Thailand	Khon Kaen	DinoCard	KKTT	2017
Turkey
Turkey	Several cities (Note: Çankırı, Gümüşhane, Kağızman, Kâhta, Rize and Yüksekova)	Türkiye Kart	PTT	?
Turkey	Adana	Belkart	Eas	?-2008
Turkey	Adana	Kentkart	Kentkart	2005
Turkey	Adıyaman	Yaman Kart	Asis	?
Turkey	Afyonkarahisar	Afyon Kart	Asis	?
Turkey	Ağrı	Agirî Kart	Asis	?
Turkey	Akçadağ	Akçadağ Kart	Asis	?
Turkey	Akçakoca	Akçakoca Kart	E-Kent	?
Turkey	Aksaray	Kart68	E-Kent	?
Turkey	Alanya	Kentkart	Kentkart	2012
Turkey	Alaplı	Kentkart	Kentkart	2017
Turkey	Altınova	Kentkart	Kentkart	?
Turkey	Amasya	Elma Kart	E-Kent	?
Turkey	Anamur	Anamur Kart	E-Kent	? (Discontinued)
Turkey	Ankara	Ankarakart	E-Kent	2014–2024
Turkey	Ankara	Başkent Kart	Asis	2024
Turkey	Antalya	Antkart	Antkart	2007 (Discontinued)
Turkey	Antalya	A-Kent	A-Kent	2011–2016
Turkey	Antalya	Antalyakart	Kentkart	2016
Turkey	Artvin	Artvinkart	Belbim	2017–2019
Turkey	Atabey	Kentekspress	Kentekspress	?
Turkey	Aydın	Aykart	Asis	2015
Turkey	Ayvalık	Ayvalık Kart	Asis	? (Discontinued)
Turkey	Balıkesir	Balkart	E-Kent	? (Discontinued)
Turkey	Balıkesir	Balkart	Asis	?
Turkey	Bandırma	Kentkart	Kentkart	2006
Turkey	Bartın	Bartın Kart	Asis	?
Turkey	Batman	Batman Kart	Asis	?
Turkey	Bayburt	Bayburt Kart	Asis	2019
Turkey	Bilecik	Bilkart	Asis	2025
Turkey	Bingöl	Bingöl Kart	Asis	?
Turkey	Bitlis	Kart13	E-Kent	2012
Turkey	Bodrum	Kentkart	Kentkart	2014 (Discontinued)
Turkey	Bolu	Kentkart	Kentkart	2009 (Discontinued)
Turkey	Bolu	Dıt Kart	Bank Asya	?-2015
Turkey	Bolu	Bolu Kart	E-Kent	2015
Turkey	Bozüyük	Boztram Kart	Veridizayn	?
Turkey	Burdur	Kentkart	Kentkart	2012
Turkey	Burhaniye	BuKart	Asis	? (Discontinued)
Turkey	Bursa	BuKart	E-Kent	2002-?
Turkey	Bursa	Bursakart	Asis	?
Turkey	Ceylanpınar	Ceylan Kart	Asis	?
Turkey	Cizre	Cizre Kart	Asis	?
Turkey	Çanakkale	Kentkart	Kentkart	2006
Turkey	Çankırı	Kart18	E-Kent	? (Discontinued)
Turkey	Çankırı	Çankırı Kart	Asis	?-2022
Turkey	Çankırı	Çankırı Kart	Teta Elektronik	2022-23 December 2025 (discontinued in favour of Türkiye Kart)
Turkey	Çınarcık	Çınarcık Kart	Asis	?
Turkey	Çorlu	Tekkart	Asis	?
Turkey	Çorum	Çorum Kart	Asis	2007
Turkey	Denizli	Kentkart	Kentkart	2005 (Discontinued)
Turkey	Denizli	Denizli Kart	Asis	?
Turkey	Divriği	Mengücekler Kart	Asis	?
Turkey	Diyarbakır	Diyarkart	Asis	?
Turkey	Doğanşehir	Doğanşehir Kart	Asis	?
Turkey	Doğantepe	Doğantepe Kart	Asis	?
Turkey	Düzce	Kart81	E-Kent	?-2020
Turkey	Düzce	Kentkart	Kentkart	2020
Turkey	Dursunbey	Ak-Kart	Teta Elektronik	?
Turkey	Edirne	Kentkart	Kentkart	2009
Turkey	Edremit	Edro Kart	E-Kent	?
Turkey	Eğirdir	Eğirdir İzkart	İzkart	?
Turkey	Elazığ	Elazığkart (formerly Elz-Kart)	Asis	2014
Turkey	Emirdağ	Emirdağ Kart	Teta Elektronik	2024
Turkey	Erzincan	CanKart	Asis	?
Turkey	Erzurum	Kardelen Kart	Asis	2007–2023
Turkey	Erzurum	Erzurum Kart	Kentkart	2023
Turkey	Esenköy	Esenköy Kart	Asis	?
Turkey	Eskişehir	Eskart	Asis	?
Turkey	Fethiye	Fethiye Kart	E-Kent	? (Discontinued)
Turkey	Gaziantep	GaziKart	Kentek	? (Discontinued)
Turkey	Gaziantep	Kart27	E-Kent	?-2017
Turkey	Gaziantep	Gaziantep Kart	Kentkart	2017
Turkey	Giresun	Giresun Kart	Asis	15 April 2026
Turkey	Gölhisar	Gölhisar Kart	Asis	?
Turkey	Gönen	Gönen Kart	Teta Elektronik	?
Turkey	Gümüşhane	Gümüş Kart	Asis	? (discontinued in 2025 in favour of Türkiye Kart)
Turkey	Hakkâri	Hakkâri Kart	Asis	2020
Turkey	Hatay	Kentkart	Kentkart	2012–2018
Turkey	Hatay	Hatay Kart	Asis	2018
Turkey	Iğdır	Iğdır Kart	Asis	?
Turkey	Ilgın	Ilgın Kart	Asis	?
Turkey	Isparta	Gülkart	Kentkart	2010–2024
Turkey	Isparta	Kentekspress	Kentekspress	2024
Turkey	İnegöl	Kentkart	Kentkart	2010
Turkey	İscehisar	İscehisar Kart	Asis	?
Turkey	İstanbul	İstanbulkart	Belbim	2009
Turkey	İzmir	İzmir Kentkart	Kentkart	1999–2015
Turkey	İzmir	İzmirim Kart	Asis	2015
Turkey	Kahramanmaraş	Kahraman Kart	E-Kent	?
Turkey	Kâhta	Kâhta Kart	E-Kent	?-2025
Turkey	Karabük	Karabük Kart	Asis	?
Turkey	Karadeniz Ereğli	Er-Kart	Er-Kart	?
Turkey	Karadeniz Ereğli	Kentkart	Kentkart	2013
Turkey	Karaman	Karaman Kart	Asis	?
Turkey	Kastamonu	Kentkart	Kentkart	2021
Turkey	Kastamonu	Yuvam Kart	Asis	2025
Turkey	Kayseri	Kart38	E-Kent	?
Turkey	Kırıkkale	Kırıkkale Kart	Asis	?
Turkey	Kırıkkale	Kale Kart 71	Asis	2023
Turkey	Kırklareli	39 Kart	Kentkart	2020
Turkey	Kırşehir	Kırşehir Akıllı Kart	Asis	?
Turkey	Kızıltepe	Kızıltepe Kart	Asis	?
Turkey	Kilimli	Kilkart	Asis	?
Turkey	Kilis	Kart79	E-Kent	2020
Turkey	Kocaeli	Kentkart	Kentkart	2006
Turkey	Konuralp	Konuralp Kart81	E-Kent	? (discontinued)
Turkey	Konya	Konya Kart (formerly Elkart)	Konya Metropolitan Municipality	2000
Turkey	Kozlu	Kozkart	Asis	?
Turkey	Kütahya	Kart43	E-Kent	?
Turkey	Kütahya	Kart43	Asis	2021
Turkey	Lüleburgaz	Kentkart	Kentkart	2024
Turkey	Malatya	Malatya Kart	Asis	?
Turkey	Manisa	Kentkart	Kentkart	2005–2016
Turkey	Manisa	Manisa Kart	Asis	2016–2026
Turkey	Manisa	Manisa Kart	Robopine	2026
Turkey	Mardin	Mardin Kart	Kentkart	2020
Turkey	Mersin	Kentkart	Kentkart	2012–2022
Turkey	Mersin	Mersin 33 Kart	Asis	2022
Turkey	Merzifon	Paşa Kart	E-Kent	2012–2022
Turkey	Muğla	Kentkart	Kentkart	2008
Turkey	Muş	Muş Kart	Asis	?
Turkey	Nevşehir	Nevkart	E-Kent	2022
Turkey	Niğde	Kentkart	Kentkart	2014
Turkey	Ordu	Ordum Kart	Kentkart	2018
Turkey	Osmaniye	Kentkart	Kentkart	2020
Turkey	Patnos	Patnos Kart	Teta Elektronik	?
Turkey	Patnos	Patnos Kart	Asis	?
Turkey	Safranbolu	Kentkart	Kentkart	2021
Turkey	Sakarya	Kart54	E-Kent	?-2018
Turkey	Sakarya	Kart54	Asis	2018
Turkey	Samsun	Samkart	Asis	2007
Turkey	Sarıkamış	Kristal Kart	7A Bilişim	?
Turkey	Siirt	Siirt Kart	Asis	?
Turkey	Silopi	Silopi Kart	Robopine	2026
Turkey	Simav	Simav Kart	E-Kent	?
Turkey	Sivas	Kentkart	Kentkart	2007
Turkey	Solhan	Solhan Kart	Sole System	?
Turkey	Subaşı	Subaşı Kart	Asis	?
Turkey	Susuz, Afyonkarahisar	Susuz Kart	Sole System	?
Turkey	Şanlıurfa	Urfa Kart	Asis	?
Turkey	Şırnak	Şehrinuh Kart	Asis	2023
Turkey	Şuhut	Şuhut Kart	Teta Elektronik	?
Turkey	Tarsus	TaKart	E-Kent	? (Discontinued)
Turkey	Tavşanlı, Altınova	Tavşanlı Kart	Asis	?
Turkey	Tekirdağ	Tekkart	Asis	?
Turkey	Tokat	Tok Kart	E-Kent	? (discontinued in 2025)
Turkey	Tokat	Tokart	Kentkart	2025
Turkey	Tosya	Tosya Kart	Teta	2025
Turkey	Trabzon	Takkart	Antkart	? (Discontinued)
Turkey	Trabzon	Metropol Trabzon Kart	Asis	?
Turkey	Tunceli	Tunceli Kart	Asis	?
Turkey	Turhal	TurKart	Asis	?
Turkey	Umurbey	Umurbey Kart	Asis	?
Turkey	Uşak	Kart64	E-Kent	?-2015
Turkey	Uşak	Uşak Kart	E-Kent	2024
Turkey	Üzümlü	Üzümlü Kart	Asis	?
Turkey	Üzümören	Üzümören Kart	Asis	?
Turkey	Van	Belvan Kart	Asis	2017
Turkey	Yalova	Yalova Kart	Asis	?
Turkey	Yenice	Yenice Kart	Asis	?
Turkey	Yeşilyenice	YeniceKart	Asis	?
Turkey	Yozgat	Kentkart	Kentkart	2009
Turkey	Yüksekova	Yovakart	Teta Elektronik	2021–2025
Turkey	Zile	Zile Akıllı Kart	Asis	?
Turkey	Zonguldak	Zonkart	Asis	?
Turkmenistan	Ashgabat	Ýol karty	Ministry of Automobile Transport of Turkmenistan / Central Bank of Turkmenistan	20.09.2017
United Arab Emirates	Dubai	Nol Card	Roads & Transport Authority	August 2009
United Arab Emirates	Abu Dhabi	Hafilat Card	Integrated Transport Centre	15 May 2015
United Arab Emirates	Sharjah	Sayer Card	Mowasalat	2007
United Arab Emirates	Ajman	Masaar Card	PTC	September 2020
United Arab Emirates	Ras Al Khaimah	E-Saqr Card	Ras Al Khaimah Transport Authority	November 2022
Uzbekistan	Tashkent	ATTO	Avtomatlashtirilgan transport to’lov tizimi operatori	2020

== Europe ==
Country	Region(s)	Name of Card	Provider	Date of Introduction
Austria	Wels	Bestpreisticket	Linie Wels	2002. Saver fares for city bus services.
Belarus	Minsk	Minsktrans card	МIНСКТРАНС (Minsktrans)	
Belgium	Whole country	MoBIB	SNCB-NMBS, TEC, De Lijn, STIB-MIVB	2008
Bulgaria	Sofia	Електронна безконтактна чип карта (Public Transport Card)	Център за градска мобилност (Urban Mobility Centre)	September 2008. Passes for all modes of transport. Saver tickets for tram and trolley only.
Bulgaria	Sofia	Карта за метро (Subway Card)	Метрополитен ЕАД (Sofia Metro)	Saver tickets for subway only.
Croatia	Osijek	Butra	GPP	September 2008
Croatia	Pula	BusCARD	Pulapromet	2003
Croatia	Rijeka	Rijeka City Card	Autotrolej	2013
Croatia	Zagreb	ZET Card	Zagrebački električni tramvaj (Zagreb Electric Tram)	Unknown
Cyprus	Nicosia	Motion Card	Cyprus Public Transport	2019
Czech Republic	Prague	Lítačka	Dopravní podnik hl.m. Prahy	March 2016
Czech Republic	Prague	Opencard		2008–2020
Czech Republic	Whole country (ČD network)	In Karta	ČD In Karta	2006
Denmark	Almost whole country (except Bornholm)	Rejsekort	Rejsekort & Rejseplan A/S	Entered test in December 2007 Country-wide introduction in 2016 (except Bornholm)
Estonia	Tallinn	Ühiskaart	Ühendatud Piletid	Introduced in September 2012, expected to replace paper tickets by January 2013 and ID-card based tickets by April 2013.
Faroe Islands	Entire Territory	Ferðakort	Strandfaraskip Landsins (municipal buses, including in Tórshavn, are fare-free)	2004
Finland	Whole country	Bus card	Matkahuolto (a national long-distance bus service)	?
Finland	Greater Helsinki	Travel card	YTV (2001–2009) HSL (2010–2019)	2001 (replaced by the HSL Card in 2019)
Finland	Greater Helsinki	HSL Card	HSL	2018
Finland	Oulu	Bus card	Koskilinjat OY	January 1992
Finland	Tampere	Bus card	Tampere City Transport	?
Finland	Vaasa	Bus card	Vaasan paikallisliikenne	?
France	Basque Country	Carte TXIK TXAK	TXIK TXAK	2020
France	Bordeaux	La Carte TBM	Transports Bordeaux Métropole	2003
France	Caen	Twisto		June 2013 on smartphones NFC
France	Lille	Pass Pass	Transpole	2013
France	Lorraine	Simplicite	TER Lorraine-Metrolor	Unknown
France	Lyon	Técély card	TCL	1 July 2002
France	Nantes	Libertan	Semitan	
France	Nice	Citizy	Lignes d'Azur, tram and bus of the Métropole	21 May 2010, first in Europe on smartphones NFC and by bank card NFC
France	Nouvelle-Aquitaine	Modalis	Nouvelle-Aquitaine Mobilités	2019 (January)
France	Paris	Navigo card	Île-de-France Mobilités	October 2001 (RFID), December 2013 (NFC), July 2018 on smartphones NFC
France	Périgueux	Carte Péribus	Agence PÉRIMOUV'	Defunct 2025 (28 April)
France	Rennes	Korrigo	STAR	2006
France	Strasbourg	BADGEO, then U'GO	CTS	September 2004 (RFID), June 2013 on smartphones NFC
France	Toulouse	Pastel card	Midi-Pyrénées region	2007
France	Tours	Multipass	Multipass Centre	2002
Georgia	Tbilisi	Metromoney	Tbilisi Transport Company	2019
Germany	Berlin	fahrCard	Berliner Verkehrsbetriebe (BVG)	September 2011
Germany	Schwäbisch Hall	Kolibricard	Kreisverkehr Schwäbisch Hall	March 2006
Germany	Hohenlohekreis	Kolibricard	Nahverkehr Hohenlohe (NVH)	March 2007
Germany	Region Donau-Iller	DingCard	Donau-Iller-Nahverkehrs-GmbH	1998
Germany	Rhein-Ruhr	eTicketing	Verkehrsverbund Rhein-Ruhr	2003
Germany	Reutlingen	+k@rte	Reutliner Stadtverkehr and Kurz service 105 (excluding night buses)	March 2017
Germany	Paderborn	smilecard	Padersprinter	2 November 2015
Greece	Athens	ATH.ENA Ticket ATH.ENA Card	Transport for Athens (buses, trolleybuses, metro, tram and suburban railway)	February 2017 (ATH.ENA Ticket) October 2017 (ATH.ENA Card)
Hungary	Budapest	RIGO	Budapesti Közlekedési Központ (BKK)	2016 through 2018, was only in test phase on one bus route
Iceland	Reykjavík (Capital Region)	Klapp	Strætó bs.	17 November 2021
Ireland	Dublin	Dublin Bus Smartcard	Dublin Bus	2010
Ireland	Dublin	Luas Smart Card	Luas	21 March 2005 - Discontinued in favour of the new Leap Card
Ireland	Dublin	Leap Card	National Transport Authority	December 2011
Ireland	Cork	Leap Card	National Transport Authority	April 2014
Ireland	Nationwide	Leap Card	National Transport Authority	October 2015
Italy	Campania Region	Unico Campania SmartCard		
Italy	Rome	Metrebus Card	Motorola/ST	1999 (magnetic) 2013 (RFID)
Italy	Venice	Carta Venezia/ imob.venezia		2008
Italy	Piedmont Region	BIP Card	Calypso	2009
Italy	Pisa Urban Area	Carta Mobile		2017
Latvia	Riga	E-talons	Rigas Satiksme	2009
Lithuania	Vilnius	Vilniečio kortelė (renamed JUDU in 2023)	Susisiekimo paslaugos (JUDU)	15 August 2012
Lithuania	Kaunas	Žiogas	Kauno autobusai	2018
Lithuania	Klaipėda	KKT e-ticket	Klaipėda city passenger transport	2010
Lithuania	Šiauliai	Busturas e-ticket	Busturas	2015
Lithuania	Panevėžys	PKT e-ticket	Panevėžio kelevinis transportas	2023
Lithuania	Tauragė County	Tauragė region e-ticket	Žaliasis regionas	2023
Kosovo	Prizren	Prizren City Card	Kentkart	January 2009 – Discontinued
Luxembourg	Whole country	miniCash electronic purse	Cetrel	1999
Luxembourg	Whole country	e-go	Verkéiers Verbond (AVL CFL RGTR TICE)	2008, abolished in 2014
Luxembourg	Whole country	M-kaart (Mobilitéitskaart)	Verkéiers Verbond (AVL CFL RGTR TICE)	August 2014
Netherlands	Almost whole country	OV-chipkaart	Trans Link Systems	2005 (Rotterdam), 2006 (Amsterdam), 2009–2010 (East area), 19 May 2011 (Whole area except the Caribbean Netherlands). To be replaced with OVpay and discontinued y the end of 2027.
North Macedonia	Skopje	Moja Karta	Kentkart	2008 – Discontinued
Norway	Oslo	Reisekort	Ruter & Norges Statsbaner	2008
Norway	Hordaland	Skysskortet	Skyss	2008
Norway	Rogaland	Kolumbuskort	Kolumbus	2006
Norway	Trøndelag	t:kort	AtB	
Norway	Troms	Tromskort	Troms fylkeskommune	
Norway	Ferries in Rogaland, Hordaland, Sunnmøre and Trondheimsfjord	Verdikort	Tide Sjø	2009
Norway	Most ferries nationwide	AutoPASS for ferje	Statens vegvesen	2019
Poland	Białystok	Białostocka Karta Miejska	BKM Consortium (KPK, KZK and KPKM)	
Poland	Gdańsk	Gdansk City Card	EMAX	July 2006
Poland	Katowice urban area	Metrokarta	Transport GZM	1 October 2015 (ŚKUP), replaced with Metrokarta on 28 September 2023
Poland	Kraków	Cracow City Card (Krakowska Karta Miejska)	MPK Kraków	October 2005
Poland	Lublin	Lubika	Zarząd Transportu Miejskiego w Lublinie	2021 (year of last change of fare of it)
Poland	Opole	Opolka	MZK Opole	
Poland	Poznań	Komkarta, replaced by PEKA in 2014		2002, 2014
Poland	Rybnik	Rybnik City Card (e-Karta)	E-Karta	November 2006
Poland	Tczew	Tczew City Card	Kentkart	2009
Poland	Warsaw	Warsaw City Card (Karta Miejska)	ZTM	October 2001
Poland	Wrocław	URBANcard	Mennica Polska S.A.	May 2010
Portugal	Aveiro	MoveAveiro	Transportes Urbanos de Aveiro	2002
Portugal	Funchal	Giro	Horários do Funchal	February 2007
Portugal	Lisbon	Lisboa VIVA	Otlis	November 2001 (Now replaced by Navegante)
Portugal	Lisbon	Lisboa Card	Associação Turismo de Lisboa	May 2005
Portugal	Lisbon	Navegante	Transportes Metropolitanos de Lisboa	April 2019
Portugal	Porto	Andante	Transportes Intermodais do Porto	2002
Romania	Bucharest	Cardul Activ	STB (RATB until 2018)	2006 / 2007
Russia	Chelyabinsk	Uralinfotect	CFT	2004
Russia	Chuvashia	United Transport Card of Chuvashia	Chuvashia government	1 June 2008
Russia	Kazan	Transport Card	Kazan City Authority	
Russia	Kemerovo	Electronic pass	Kemerovo transit	20 Jan 2010
Russia	Lipetsk	Lipetsk Transport System united transport card	Lipetsk Transport	1 Jan 2010
Russia	Moscow	Troika	Moscow Metro and Mosgortrans	2 April 2013
Russia	Moscow	Transport Card	Moscow Metro	1 September 1998
Russia	Moscow	Transport Card	Mosgortrans	Introduced on 12 May 2001. Fully implemented on all routes in April 2006. 3 of 689 routes now working without turnstiles.
Russia	Nizhny Novgorod	Autochip petroil smart card	Autocard	1998
Russia	Novgorod	Beresta	T-Karta	June 2018
Russia	Novosibirsk	Transport card	CFT	2006
Russia	Orenburg	United transport card	Orenburg transport	1 Oct 2007
Russia	Ryazan	UmKA		2013
Russia	Saint Petersburg	Podorozhnik	Saint Petersburg Metro	2004
Russia	Samara	Transport card – Samara	Samara transit	2008 or 2009
Russia	Volgograd	Volna	Volgograd transit	2017
Russia	Yekaterinburg	EKARTA		2009
Serbia	Belgrade	BusPlus	Kentkart	1. February 2012.
Serbia	Subotica	SuBus		2012
Slovakia	Almost whole country	Slovenský dopravný pas	TransData	2018. Cards with different logotypes issued by bus operators within project Slovenský dopravný pas
Slovenia	Ljubljana	Urbana	Javni holding Ljubljana	2009
Spain	Barcelona	Bicing T-mobilitat	Barcelona sharing bicycle system SocMobilitat	2007 2021
Spain	Basque Country	Barik (interoperable in Basque Country)	Biscay Transport Consortium	September 2011, pilot test in 2004
Spain	Basque Country	MUGI (interoperable in Basque Country)	ATTG (Autoridad Territorial del Transporte de Gipuzkoa)	2013
Spain	Basque Country	Tarjeta Lurraldebus (interoperable in Basque Country)	ATTG (Autoridad Territorial del Transporte de Gipuzkoa)	
Spain	Basque Country	BAT (interoperable in Basque Country)	Ayuntamiento de Vitoria-Gasteiz, Euskotren	
Spain	Girona	TMG	Transports Municipals del Gironès	1999
Spain	Madrid	Tarjeta Transporte Público	Consorcio Regional de Transportes de Madrid	May 2012
Spain	Metropolitan Areas of Andalusia	Tarjeta de transporte	Metropolitan Transport Consortiums of Andalusia	2005
Spain	Palma de Mallorca	Targeta ciutadana		January 2006
Spain	Valencia	Targeta mobilis	ATMV (Autoritat de Transport Metropolità de València)	January 2009
Spain	Valencia	Targeta SUMA	ATMV (Autoritat de Transport Metropolità de València)	2022 (31 January)
Spain	Zaragoza	Tarjeta Ciudadana		
Spain	Zaragoza	Tarjeta BUS		
Spain	Zaragoza	Tarjeta InterBUS		
Spain	Zaragoza	Abonos 30-90-365 Auzsa		
Spain	Zaragoza	Tarjeta del Pensionista		
Spain	Zaragoza	Tarjeta Zaragoza Card		
Spain	Zaragoza	Tarjeta Bizi		
Sweden	Whole country	Contactless MasterCard or Visa	First ICA, later various kinds of businesses	18 June 2015
Sweden	Blekinge County; Halland County; Jönköping County; Kronoberg County	Resekort; Same card as Jojo-kortet with different logotypes, interoperable within counties	Blekingetrafiken; Hallandstrafiken; Jönköpings Länstrafik; Kronobergstrafiken	2010
Sweden	Skåne County	Jojo-kortet; Interoperable with Blekinge, Halland, Jönköping, and Kronoberg counties	Skånetrafiken	Intro 2009 (October); Defunct 2019 (14 December)
Sweden	Skåne County	Reskort	Skånetrafiken	2020
Sweden	Östergötland County	Resekortet	ÖstgötaTrafiken	2008
Sweden	Stockholm County	SL Access	SL	Intro October 2008. Defunct 2023
Sweden	Stockholm County	SL card	SL	2022
Sweden	Västra Götaland County	Västtrafikkortet	Västtrafik	2006
Ukraine	Kharkiv	Kharkiv Contactless Electronic Card	Kharkiv Metro	2007 for Kharkiv Metro, 2012 for Kharkiv trolleybus, Kharkiv tram and home bills payment
Ukraine	Kyiv	Київ Цифровий (Kyiv Tsyfrovyi)	Київпастранс (Kyivpastrans)	2019
Ukraine	Lviv	Leocard	Lvivelectrotrans and others	January 2022
United Kingdom and Crown dependencies	Aberdeen	Touch Card	First Aberdeen	2018
United Kingdom and Crown dependencies	Birmingham	Swift	Transport for West Midlands	Introduced 2012, roll out complete by end of 2015.
United Kingdom and Crown dependencies	Bolton & Thames Ditton	sQuid electronic purse	sQuidcard	Available as a standalone card, store loyalty card, or as an optional application on a smartcard id from partner organisations. June 2008.
United Kingdom and Crown dependencies	Boston	Cash Top Up Card	Brylaine Travel	2018
United Kingdom and Crown dependencies	Bournemouth	Glo Smartcard	Yellow Buses	Rolled out in 2010, Replaced by Yellow Buses "smartcard" July 2018.
United Kingdom and Crown dependencies	Bournemouth	The Key	More Bus	2010
United Kingdom and Crown dependencies	Bournemouth	The Key UNIBUS	Bournemouth University	2012
United Kingdom and Crown dependencies	Bournemouth	Getting About	Bournemouth Borough Council	2018
United Kingdom and Crown dependencies	Bracknell Maidenhead Windsor	Smartcard	Courtney Connect	in use in 2018.
United Kingdom and Crown dependencies	Bradford	FirstCard	First West Yorkshire	Roll out in 2000, discontinued 2 March 2012.
United Kingdom and Crown dependencies	Brighton, Hove	The Key	Brighton & Hove Bus and Coach Company	August 2011
United Kingdom and Crown dependencies	Bristol	Wessex Red (formerly Ulink) ceased trading 2018	University of the West of England	August 2009
United Kingdom and Crown dependencies	Bristol	Touch	First West of England	2018
United Kingdom and Crown dependencies	Bristol	TravelWest Smartcard	Bristol City Council	In use in 2017
United Kingdom and Crown dependencies	Cambridgeshire	Busway (multi-operator ticket for Cambridgeshire Guided Busway)	Cambridgeshire County Council	August 2011
United Kingdom and Crown dependencies	Cardiff	Iff card	Cardiff Bus	October 2010
United Kingdom and Crown dependencies	Cheshire	Cheshire Travelcard	Cheshire County Council	2002
United Kingdom and Crown dependencies	Cornwall	Cornish Key	Cornwall County Council	Introduced February 2002 – discontinued April 2005
United Kingdom and Crown dependencies	Crawley	The Key	Metrobus	In use in 2018.
United Kingdom and Crown dependencies	Derby	Spectrum Card	Derbyshire County Council	In use in 2018
United Kingdom and Crown dependencies	Didcot	Milton Park Smartcard	Courtney Connect	in use in 2018.
United Kingdom and Crown dependencies	Dunbar	Travel Card	Eve Coaches	In use 2018
United Kingdom and Crown dependencies	Dundee	MyXplore	Xplore Dundee	Rollout started January 2017
United Kingdom and Crown dependencies	Dundee	StagecoachSmart	Stagecoach East Scotland	
United Kingdom and Crown dependencies	East Midlands	Mango	Trentbarton	March 2008
United Kingdom and Crown dependencies	East Midlands	Genie	Yourbus	In use 2017 new design 2018 - Ceased Trading 2019
United Kingdom and Crown dependencies	East Midlands	Kinchkard	Kinchbus	In use 2018
United Kingdom and Crown dependencies	Edinburgh	RidaCard (season ticket)	Transport for Edinburgh (Lothian Buses and Edinburgh Trams)	April 2001
United Kingdom and Crown dependencies	Edinburgh	Citysmart (rechargeable card)	Transport for Edinburgh (Lothian Buses and Edinburgh Trams)	September 2014
United Kingdom and Crown dependencies	England & Border areas	English National Concessionary Travel Scheme	DfT and Local Authorities	April 2008
United Kingdom and Crown dependencies	Fort William	Saltire Card	Shiel Buses	2018
United Kingdom and Crown dependencies	Glasgow	Bramble	Strathclyde Partnership for Transport	November 2013
United Kingdom and Crown dependencies	Glasgow	Tripper Card	Glasgow Tripper for use on First Glasgow, McGill's, West Coast Motors, Stagecoach West, Whitelaws	Intro 2017 (December) Defunct 2025 (1 May)
United Kingdom and Crown dependencies	Glasgow	GoSmart	McGill's Buses	2018
United Kingdom and Crown dependencies	Guernsey	Ormer Card	Island Coachways	Replaced the "wave & save" card on 1 April 2010
United Kingdom and Crown dependencies	Guernsey	Puffin Card	CT Plus Guernsey	in use in 2018
United Kingdom and Crown dependencies	Haddington	SmarTrip	Prentice of Haddington	In use 2018
United Kingdom and Crown dependencies	High Wycombe	The Key	Carousel Buses	In use 2018
United Kingdom and Crown dependencies	Ipswich	Smartrider	Ipswich Buses	In use 2016
United Kingdom and Crown dependencies	Isle of Man	Go Cards	Bus Vannin	in use in 2018.
United Kingdom and Crown dependencies	Isle of Wight	The Key	Southern Vectis	in use in 2018.
United Kingdom and Crown dependencies	Jersey	Avanchi Card	LibertyBus	In use in 2014
United Kingdom and Crown dependencies	Kent	Connected Card	Kent County Council & Medway Council	In use in 2016
United Kingdom and Crown dependencies	Leicester	One Card	Leicester City Council	October 2011
United Kingdom and Crown dependencies	Leicester	Carbonara, Pecorino, Hospital Hopper, Back to School	Centrebus	2018
United Kingdom and Crown dependencies	London	Oyster card	Transport for London	January 2004
United Kingdom and Crown dependencies	London and the South East	c2csmart	c2c	November 2014
United Kingdom and Crown dependencies	Manchester	get me there, ITSO compliant	Transport for Greater Manchester	Announced June 2012, expected to launch summer 2013.
United Kingdom and Crown dependencies	Merseyside	Live Smart 3-day city tourist ticket	Merseytravel	?
United Kingdom and Crown dependencies	Merseyside	Liverpool Day Tripper 3-day city tourist ticket starting from John Lennon Airport	Merseytravel	1 June 2011
United Kingdom and Crown dependencies	Merseyside	Walrus	Merseytravel	September 2011
United Kingdom and Crown dependencies	Newport	Freedom (pay-as-you-go)	Newport Bus	13 August 2012
United Kingdom and Crown dependencies	Newport	Passport (local season ticket)	Newport Bus	May 2010, not valid on long-distance journeys to Cardiff or Cwmbran from 28 July 2012.
United Kingdom and Crown dependencies	Newport	Passport Plus (local and long distance season ticket)	Newport Bus	28 July 2012
United Kingdom and Crown dependencies	Newport	Unigo student/staff travel card for University of Wales, Newport	Newport Bus	10 September 2012
United Kingdom and Crown dependencies	North East	Pop card	Tyne and Wear Passenger Transport Executive (also known as Nexus)	February 2011
United Kingdom and Crown dependencies	North East	The Key	Go North East	2010
United Kingdom and Crown dependencies	North East	Arriva connect	Arriva North East	2018
United Kingdom and Crown dependencies	Norfolk	Holdall Card	Norfolk County Council	In use in 2017
United Kingdom and Crown dependencies	Northern Ireland	Belfast Visitor Pass	Translink	April 2011
United Kingdom and Crown dependencies	Northern Ireland	iLink	Translink	October 2009, for bus and rail.
United Kingdom and Crown dependencies	Northern Ireland	Smartlink	Translink	2003 for Citybus (now Metro), 2005 for Ulsterbus
United Kingdom and Crown dependencies	Nottingham	Easyrider	Nottingham City Transport	September 2000
United Kingdom and Crown dependencies	Nottingham	Robin Hood Card	Nottingham City Council	14 December 2015
United Kingdom and Crown dependencies	Oxford	The Key	Oxford Bus Company	Unknown
United Kingdom and Crown dependencies	Oxford	The Key	Brookes Bus	In Use 2018
United Kingdom and Crown dependencies	Plymouth	Freedom Card	Plymouth Citybus	December 2007, discontinued 14 August 2011.
United Kingdom and Crown dependencies	Plymouth	The Key	Plymouth Citybus	Replaced the Freedom Card from 14 August 2011.
United Kingdom and Crown dependencies	Portsmouth	Park & Ride	Portsmouth City Council	In use in 2017
United Kingdom and Crown dependencies	Portsmouth	Touch Card	First Hampshire & Dorset	2018
United Kingdom and Crown dependencies	Reading	simplyBus, BOOST, easysaver10, simplyUni, simplyMatchday	Reading Buses	in use in 2017
United Kingdom and Crown dependencies	Reigate	TAP, Smart Saver	Southdown PSV	2018
United Kingdom and Crown dependencies	Scotland	Travelcard	Transport Scotland	Pilot November 2006, roll-out to all bus services 2008 – 2009
United Kingdom and Crown dependencies	Scotland	Scotrail Smartcard	ScotRail	2018
United Kingdom and Crown dependencies	South East England	The Key	Southern, Govia Thameslink Railway, Southeastern	Rollout started November 2011 Includes paper ticketing replacements (one off and season tickets) as well as a pay-as-you-go system called keyGo. Intercompatible with other Keys on buses and other train operators, such as Metrobus in Crawley.
United Kingdom and Crown dependencies	South Yorkshire	TravelMaster	TravelMaster	Roll-out started 2014
United Kingdom and Crown dependencies	Southampton	Smartcities	Southampton City Council	Pilot launched April 2000. – relaunch July 2005
United Kingdom and Crown dependencies	Southampton	The Key	Bluestar & Unilink	2012
United Kingdom and Crown dependencies	Southampton	Touch	First Hampshire & Dorset	2018
United Kingdom and Crown dependencies	Suffolk	Endeavour Card Networkcard	Suffolk County Council	In use in 2018
United Kingdom and Crown dependencies	Suffolk	SmartCash Card	Galloway European	In use in 2017
United Kingdom and Crown dependencies	Swindon	The Key	Swindon's Bus Company	July 2019 after acquisition by Go-Ahead Group
United Kingdom and Crown dependencies	Swindon	Network Card	Thamesdown Transport	August 2006, discontinued
United Kingdom and Crown dependencies	Swindon	SmartFare electronic purse stored on Thamesdown smart card	Thamesdown Transport	March 2011, discontinued
United Kingdom and Crown dependencies	Swindon	TravelPass season ticket stored on Thamesdown smart card	Thamesdown Transport	Unknown, probably in 2010, discontinued
United Kingdom and Crown dependencies	Swindon	Mondex pre-pay electronic purse on a Mondex smart card	Thamesdown Transport	July 1995, discontinued
United Kingdom and Crown dependencies	Telford & Wrekin	ArrivaCard	Arriva Midlands	Introduced June 2007 – Withdrawn December 2008
United Kingdom and Crown dependencies	Thurrock	Gateway	Ensignbus	In use in 2018
United Kingdom and Crown dependencies	Tyne & Wear	POPCard		
United Kingdom and Crown dependencies	Warrington	Midas Card	Network Warrington	In use in 2018
United Kingdom and Crown dependencies	West Yorkshire	MCard	West Yorkshire Metro	Spring 2013 with Young Persons MCard, leading into other concessions available and to further lead into PAYG MCard in late 2014, all with online purchasing.
United Kingdom and Crown dependencies	Winchester	Park and Ride Smart Card	Winchester City Council	2010
United Kingdom and Crown dependencies	Yeovil	Smart Card	South West Coaches	2018
United Kingdom and Crown dependencies	York	York by bus Smart Card	City of York Council	in use in 2018

== Gallery ==
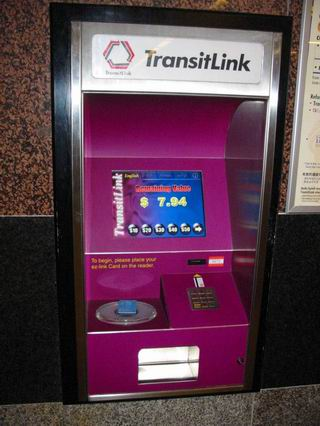
EZ-Link add value machine in Singapore

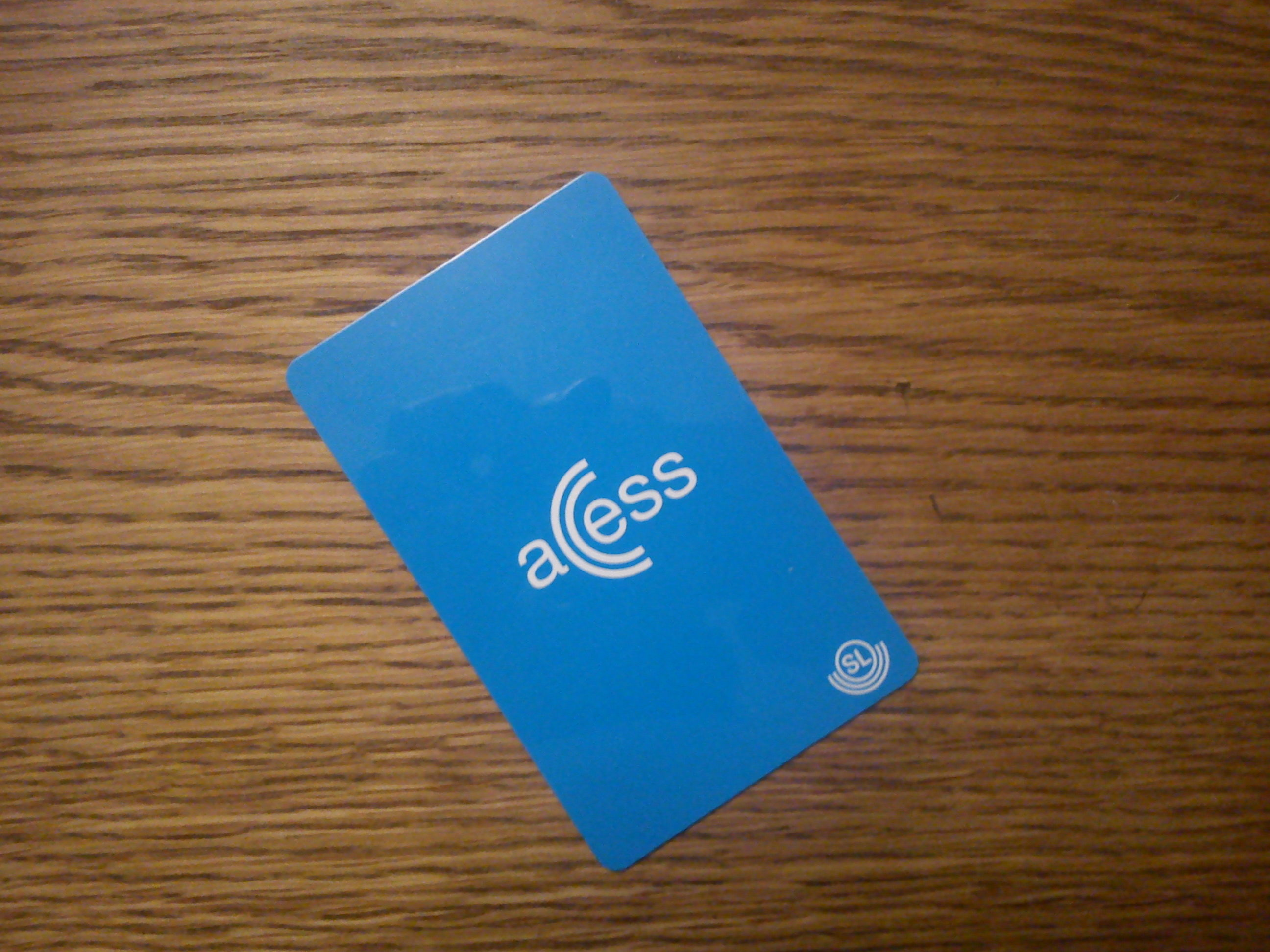
Access card in Greater Stockholm

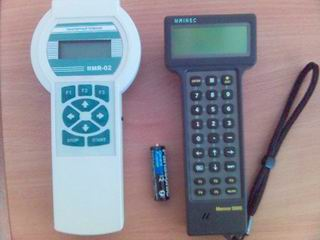
Transport fare collection terminal CFT in Novosibirsk (Russia)

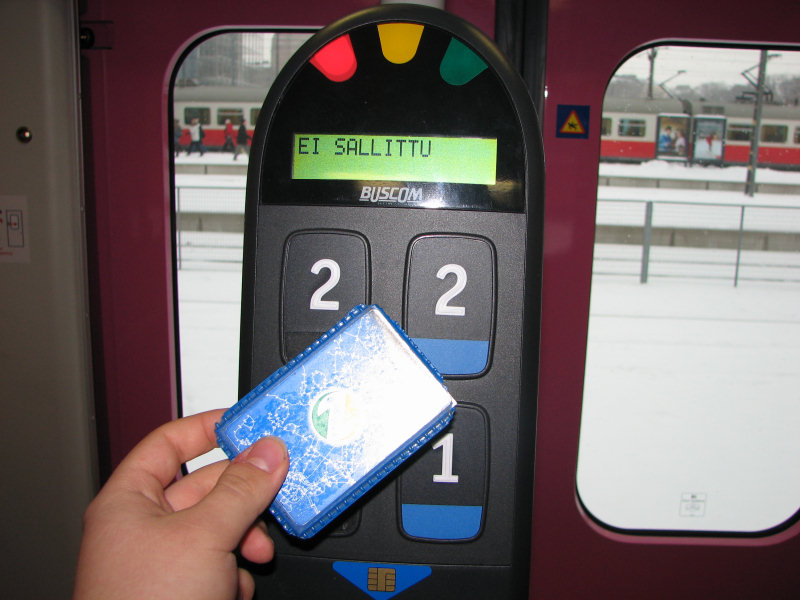
Smartcard in Helsinki area; the card is read remotely.

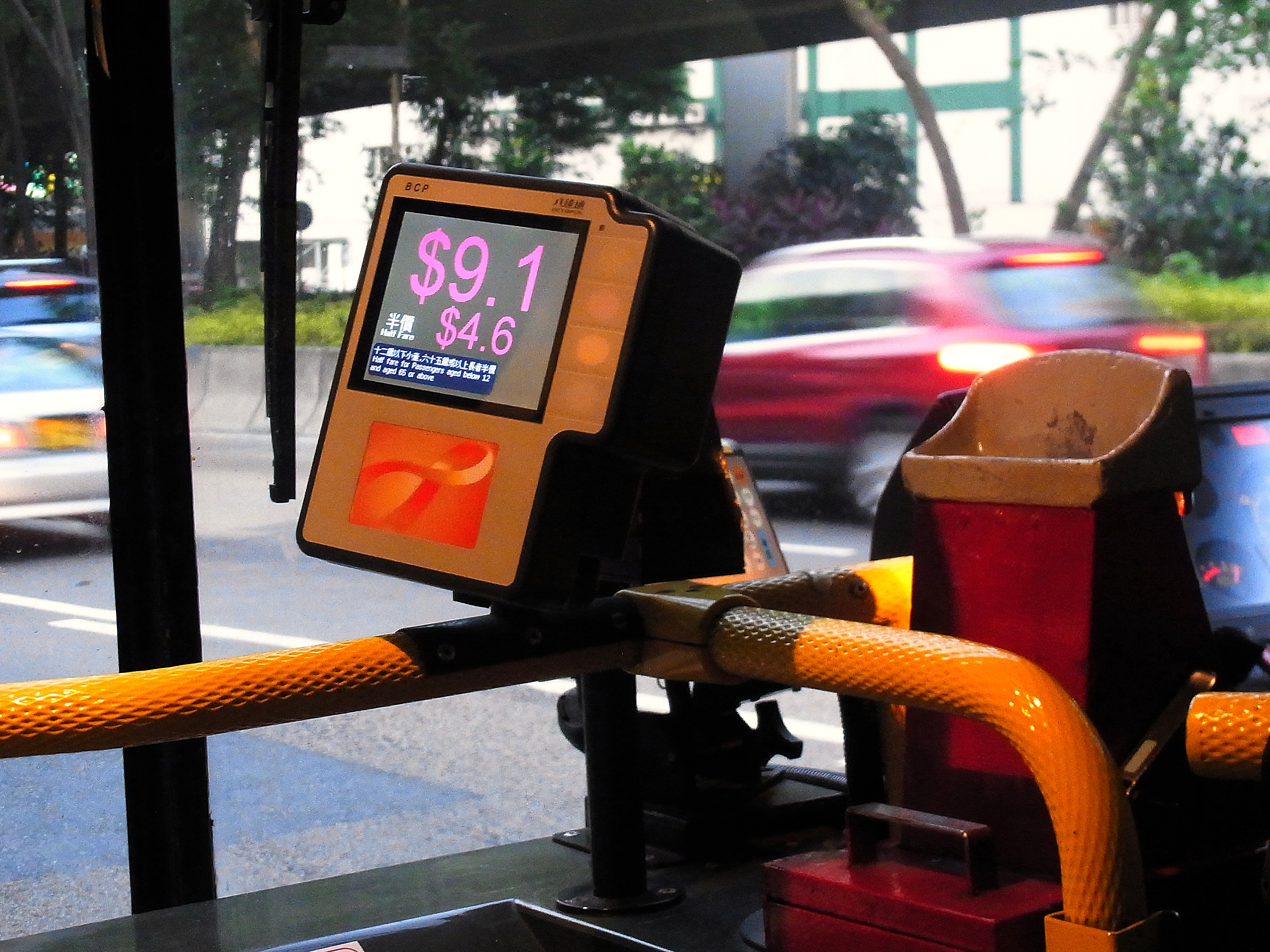
Octopus card reader on bus in Hong Kong

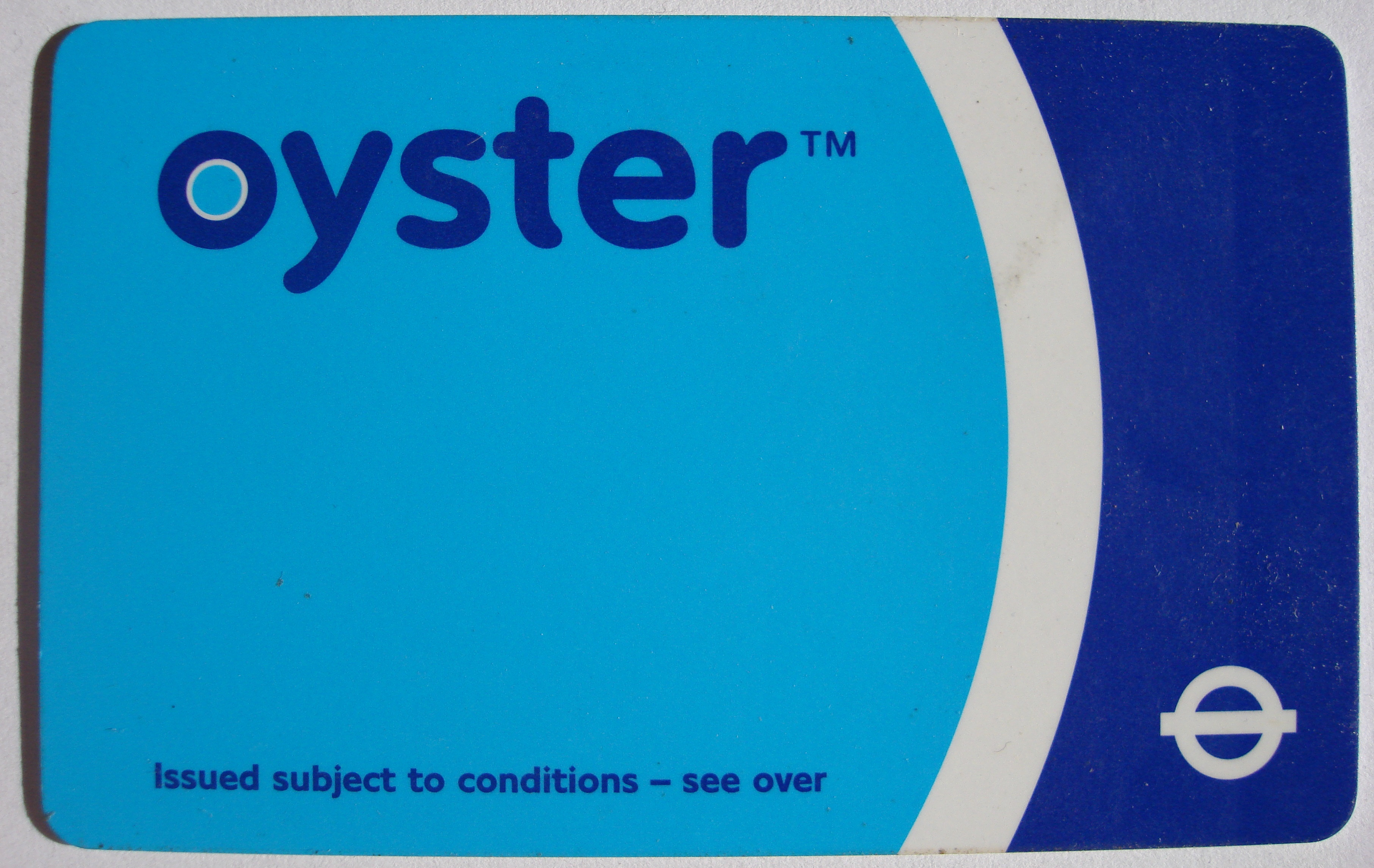
Oyster card in London, UK

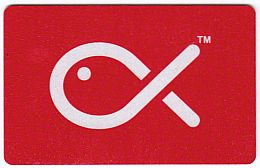
Snapper card in Wellington, New Zealand

== See also ==
- Calypso, an international electronic ticketing standard, originally designed by a group of transit operators
- CIPURSE, is an open security standard for transit fare collection systems
- Smartcards on buses and trams in Great Britain
- Smartcards on National Rail (Great Britain)
