= Red Bus =

Red Bus may refer to:

- Red Bus (Mendoza), smart card in Argentina
- Red Bus (New Zealand), bus operator in Christchurch
- Red Bus CDC NSW, bus operator on the Central Coast, Australia
- redBus, Indian online bus ticketing company
- Red London buses

== See also ==
- AEC Routemaster, a front-engined double-decker bus that was designed by London Transport.
- New Routemaster, a hybrid diesel-electric double-decker bus inspired by the AEC Routemaster and operated in London.
