= Redbus =

Redbus or Red Bus refer to:

Corporate

- Redbus Investments, formed by Cliff Stanford in the United Kingdom
  - Redbus Interhouse, a data centre colocation operator in Europe
- Redbus Film Distribution, a movie underwriter in the UK now under Lionsgate

Bus operators

- Midland Red, a former provider in the West Midlands of England
- Red Bus (New Zealand), an operator in Christchurch
- redBus, an Indian bus-based travel agency
- Red Bus CDC NSW, an Australian transport operator
- Red Jammers, an American bus service in Glacier National Park, United States

Other

- Red Bus (Mendoza), a transport payment system used in Argentina

== See also ==
- AEC Routemaster bus design, painted red and synonymous with transport in London, England
