= Easyrider (smart card) =

English contactless smartcard

The easyrider Citycard, (known formally as EasyRider and locally as RealRider), is a contactless smartcard introduced in 2000 in Nottingham, England, for use on Nottingham City Transport Services. It was originally named 'BusCard'. The name EasyRider was first used by NCT in 1981 for a pre-paid, paper-based system that was carried and used with a photo-identity card. In September 2009 the card was relaunched as 'easyrider Citycard'; it merged easyrider and Citycard into one card.

== Background ==
The Easyrider card is a contactless smartcard. Travellers wave the card past the green readers on Nottingham City Transport buses. The card can not be used at tram stops.

== Cards ==
There are four different kinds of easyrider cards; easyrider Everyday, easyrider Anyday, and their respective 'further' versions for use on South Notts 1 to Loughborough and Pathfinder 100 to Southwell, as well as other services that extend beyond the City Zone into the Outer Area.

=== easyrider Everyday ===
Blue card, can be purchased in blocks from 7 days up to 1 year. Activated for all NCT buses in that period of time. The card carries a photograph of the holder.

=== easyrider Anyday ===
Easyrider Anyday can be purchased for 5, 10, 20 or 100 days. However, it is activated only on the days it is used and so is useful for those who travel regularly but not on consecutive days.

=== easyrider Purse ===
Like an electronic purse, ordinary tickets can be bought at a reduced price using credit stored on it.

=== Citycard Senior ===
Allows over 60s to travel free within the county.

=== Citycard Mobility/Mobility+ ===
Allows the disabled to travel free within the county.

=== Student Cards ===
Students of the Nottingham Trent University can also use their university ID cards on Nottingham City Transport and NET, activated in the University at Chaucer Building (City Site) or George Eliot Building (Clifton Campus) at discounted rates. They can also be topped up at the NCT Travel Centre in the usual way.

Students of the University of Nottingham are able to use their University Cards for travel. They can top up their cards in the Student's Union travel centre.

== Milestones ==
- First contactless smartcard in the UK is launched in Nottingham, called BusCard (September 2000)
- BusCard renamed EasyRider City (March 2004)
- Tram services commence, and EasyRider City smartcards are accepted, although conductors are unable to validate them (March 2004)
- EasyRider Child launched (August 2004)
- EasyRider Anytime launched (September 2004)
- EasyRider Child renamed EasyRider <16 (September 2005)
- Tram conductors begin reading cards (September 2005)
- Trent Barton announce contactless smartcard, called 'ToTo' (February 2006)
- Citycard Senior/Mobility/Mobility+ revealed (Mid 2007)
- Trent Barton reveal contactless smartcard, called 'Mango' (Late 2007)
- EasyRider <16 extended to 18 years of age, now called EasyRider <18 (March 2008)
- EasyRider Anytime <18 launched (August 2008)
- easyrider Citycard family launched (September 2009)

== Competition ==
In late 2007, Trent Barton, a neighbouring bus operator in the Nottingham Urban Area, revealed their contactless smartcard system, Mango.

== See also ==
- List of smart cards
