= Vem =

Brazilian transit smart card system

Vem Card
- Location: Recife metropolitan area, Brazil
- Launched: May 2009
- Manager: Grande Recife Transport Consortium
- Currency: Real (year pass maximum load)
- Validity: Trains; Buses; Trams
- Retailed: Ticket offices, BRT Stations
- Website: Vem Recife

The VEM (Acronym of Vale eletrônico Metropolitano, Electronic Metropolitan Ticket) is a Smart card system used in bus, train and metro of the metropolitan area of Recife, Brazil.

The VEM cards operate by using contactless technology as they have an internal chip that communicates with the validator by RFID.

Since 11 of June 2014, All credits in VEM card has a validity of 180 days.

There are many types of the Vem Card:

"Trabalhador" (worker) Green color: is the standard and most issued version, with more than million and half issued cards. This card complies with Brazilian "vale transporte" rules, meaning that the credit is paid by the company that the user works and can only be used by that user in their house to work ride and vice versa, being impossible use the same card twice in a same ride, also there is a daily use limit of 8 rides. The card credit is paid by companies using a web-based application and the card is recharged during its normal use in Buses or Metro after 48 hours the credit is paid by the company. The use and balance of this type of card can be checked using a web-based application. The card is printed with the user name and its CPF. the worker card can also carry "comum" credit type.

"Comum" (common) Green color: This is the standard card for non-worker users. It can be obtained by free by any user, as no data of the user is printed on card, however, the first charge is fixed in R$25,00. It can be purchased/recharged only with cash at the VEM site located at Rua da Soledade 259, Boa vista without any fares or at any reseller by adding a convenience fare of 2,5% of the recharge (it is deducted of the charge). How those sellers act as a resellers, often them can not recharge the card because all their "stock of credit" were sold. There is no discount in fare by using this card, except in the case you use interchange train-buses or buses-buses in some very specific lines. How this card is not linked to any law or rule, you can use it how many times you want until the card have credit, also if the card is lost, is impossible to retrieve its credit, as it are not linked to any CPF. the worker card can carry "common" credit type, meaning that is not necessary to buy another card if you have a worked card, you just need to add funds to it.

Since June 2014, with the opening of BRT stations, the use of a VEM card is mandatory in the BRT system. The common card can be purchased in BRT Stations by R$4,00.

"Estudante" (student) Yellow color: It is granted for almost any student whose school is located within Recife Metropolitan Area (only some exceptions apply) and it deducts only half of the fare. The card is printed with the photo of the user, and after its use, you need to show your student ID card to have your access authorized. In future, the fingerprint will be needed to be presented to certify that is the user that are using the card. To obtain and recharge it, riders need to get a student card and some documents of your school proof of student status. This card can not be used in special services like air conditioned buses, and have a daily limit of 8 uses and a monthly limit of 60 rides.

"Rodoviário" (Bus driver) white color: used by bus drivers and fare collector to operate the system and to obtain free ride. the card has the worker photo and can only be used by them, in future, fingerprint will be needed during its use for free rides.

"Infantil" (for children) fully colored with drawings: for children under six who cannot go through the turnstiles.

"Livre Acesso": Blue or Orange color: This card grants access by free in public transport for people with some disability. The blue version is for people that not need a helper to travel, the orange is for who need the helper, granting the free ride for them, too. This card has the user photo printed and can only be used by its user. In future, fingerprint will be needed to be presented. Due Brazilian law, There are no limits for using those cards.

"Idoso" (elderly) Red color: Still Not Released.

"Vem Jaboatão": The city of Jaboatão dos Guararapes are not part of Grande Recife transport consortium, so it can not use the metropolitan VEM in its municipal micro-buses, so a new VEM needed to be created. It is not compatible with the metropolitan version.

== See also ==
- Recife Metro
