= Horários do Funchal =

Bus company in Funchal, Madeira

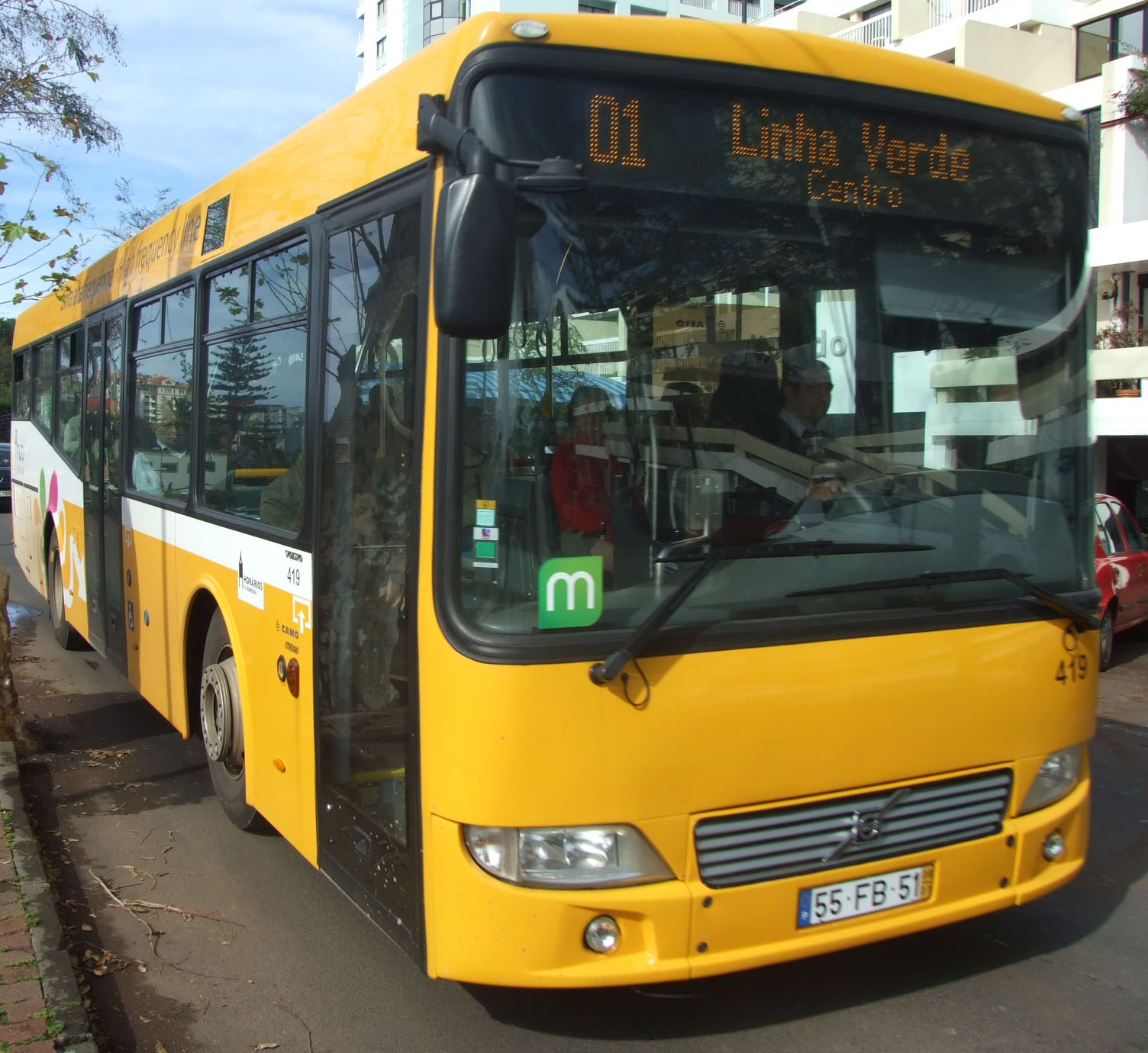
- Volvo B12B in Linha Verde in February 2010.
- Founded: 1987
- Headquarters: Funchal, Madeira Island, Portugal
- Service type: Urban & Inter-urban services
- Destinations: Funchal
- Website: www.horariosdofunchal.pt

Horários do Funchal is a bus operator based in Funchal, Madeira. They operate Urban and Inter-urban services on the south, central, and north of the island.

== History ==
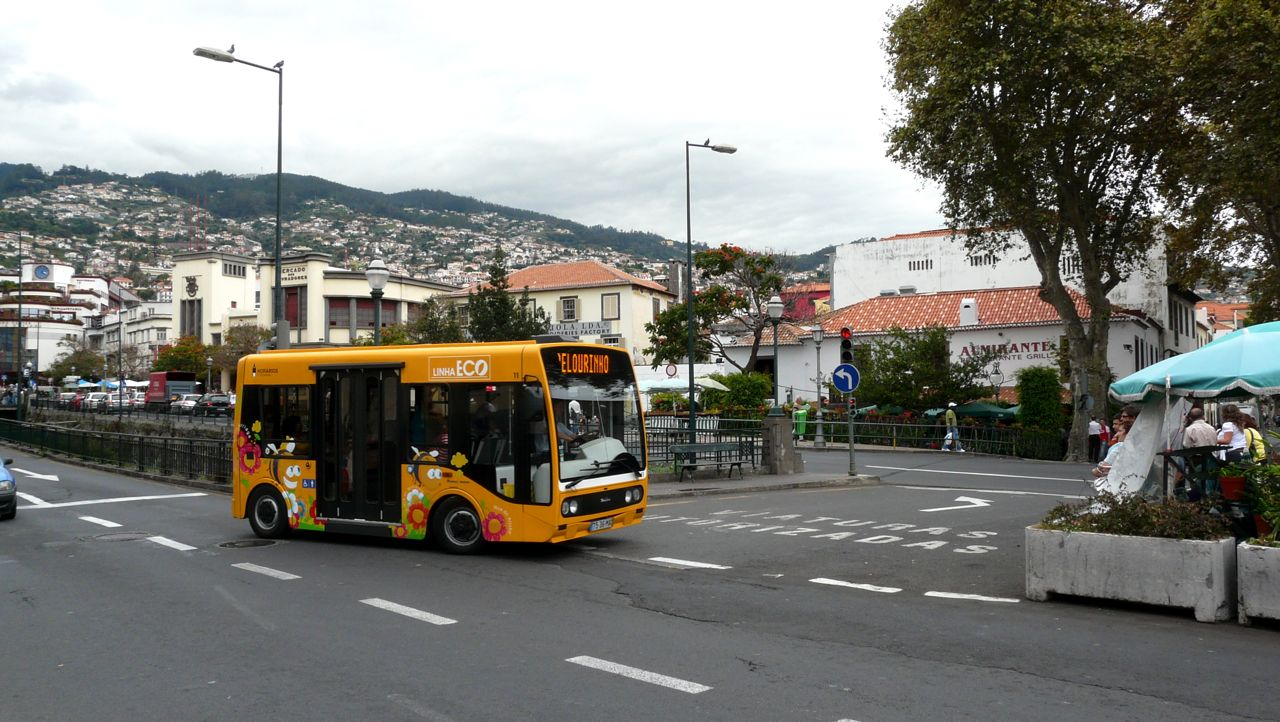
"Linha Eco" in 2008

On 11 April 1985, the Committee for the Study of Urban Transportation (CETU) was created by the government to study the island and its public transport. As a result, on 12 August 1986 the first bus arrived with services beginning on 1 January 1987, with the company being chaired by Sr. Coronel Ramiro Morna do Nascimento.

In 1996, the company acquired Companhia dos Carros de São Gonçalo S.A., Emílio de Castro e Companhia Lda, Empresa Automobilística de São Martinho Lda, Companhia dos Automóveis de Santo António Lda.

In 2006, the company brought 4 electric buses and branded them as "Linha Eco".

In 2007 a contactless smart card, called GIRO, was introduced for fare payment.

In late 2008, the first low floor buses for urban services arrived.

== Fleet ==
As of 2024, the fleet consisted of around 250 buses.
