= Ras Al Khaimah Transport Authority =

Transportation authority in Ras Al Khaimah, United Arab Emirates

- هيئة رأس الخيمة للمواصلات

Agency overview
- Formed: 2008; 18 years ago
- Jurisdiction: Emirate of Ras Al Khaimah
- Headquarters: Al Dhait, Ras Al Khaimah, United Arab Emirates
- Agency executives: ENG. Esmaeel Hassan Alblooshi, Director General; H.E. Naser Salem Muraddad, Board Chairman; H.E. Yousef M. Esmaeel, Vice Chairman; H.E Mohammed Ali Abdullah Al Sharhan, Board Member; H.E. Saif Hamad Qadib Al Zaabi, Board Member; H.E. Hashem Ahmed Saeed Al Mansoori, Board Member; H.E. Ali Hasan Jakka Al Mansoori, Board Member
- Website: www.rakta.gov.ae

The Ras Al Khaimah Transport Authority (Arabic: هيئة رأس الخيمة للمواصلات), commonly known as RAKTA, is the sole major independent government roads and transportation authority in the Emirate of Ras Al Khaimah, United Arab Emirates. It was founded in 2008 to improve transportation around the Emirate. It provides public transport services, taxi services, school buses, marine transportation, freight transportation, commercial transportation, and various other transportation activities.

== History ==
In 2008, RAKTA was formed in accordance with the Emiri Decree No. (1) of 2008 to improve, plan and develop transportation around the emirate. In 2019, ITC and RAKTA signed a memorandum of understanding connecting both Abu Dhabi and Ras Al Khaimah by intercity bus.

== Services ==
As of 2024, the services RAKTA operates are:

- RAKBus
- E-Saqr Card
- Musharaka
- Al Hamra Taxi

=== International bus ===
In 2019, RAKTA launched international service to Musandam, connecting both Ras Al Khaimah and Musandam more closely.

== See also ==
- Ras Al Khaimah
- Ras Al Khaimah International Airport
