= Transcollines =

Public transit agency

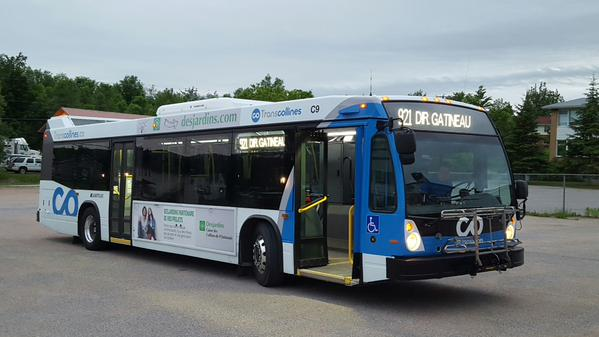

Overview
- Area served: Les Collines-de-l'Outaouais Regional County Municipality
- Transit type: bus
- Number of lines: 12
- Annual ridership: 203,210 (2023)
- Website: https://transcollines.ca/en/

Operation
- Began operation: 2015

Transcollines is a public transit agency serving the Regional County Municipalities of Pontiac and Les Collines-de-l'Outaouais in Quebec, Canada.

== History ==
In 2011, the Regional Municipality of Les Collines-de-l'Outaouais looked into the possibility of replacing bus service contracted by the Société de transport de l'Outaouais (STO) with a distinct transit network and combining it with the existing regional paratransit system.

A transit agency was formed in 2013 to replace all the existing agencies. A contract was granted to Autobus Campeau, and after some delays, service began on June 15, 2015.

In its first year of service, Transcollines made 180,000 trips and had 270 regular users with monthly passes. In 2018, there were 261,768 trips and 494 regular monthly users. In 2023, there were 203,210 trips made.

== Service ==
Transcollines has four types of bus service:

- Fixed-route scheduled bus and minibus service
- Intercity coach service between L'Isle-aux-Alumettes and Ottawa
- On-demand service
- Paratransit

=== Routes ===
Routes are numbered according to their location:

- Route 910 is in the Pontiac Regional County Municipality
- Routes 920 to 929 are in La Pêche and Chelsea
- Routes 930 to 939 are in Cantley
- Routes 940 to 949 are in Val-des-Monts
- Routes 990 to 999 operate on-demand only

All routes except route 924 run on weekdays only.

No.	Inbound terminus	Outbound terminus	Destinations served	Notes
910	Cégep de l'Outaouais (Gabrielle-Roy campus)	Pontiac	Shawville, Campbell's Bay, Fort-Coulonge, L'Isle-aux-Allumettes	Runs twice daily. It is the only route with no direct connection to the Rapibus bus rapid transit network.
921	Galeries de Hull	La Pêche	Chelsea, Centre Wakefield park and ride, Wakefield proper (route 923 only), La Pêche, Cégep de l'Outaouais (route 925 only)	Route 921 is an express service that mostly uses Autoroute 5. Route 921 runs twice daily towards Gatineau and once towards La Pêche in the afternoon. Route 923 runs to and from Gatineau during peak periods only. Route 925 runs three times in both directions daily — once in the morning, once in the afternoon, and once around noon.
923	Galeries de Hull	La Pêche	Chelsea, Centre Wakefield park and ride, Wakefield proper (route 923 only), La Pêche, Cégep de l'Outaouais (route 925 only)	Route 921 is an express service that mostly uses Autoroute 5. Route 921 runs twice daily towards Gatineau and once towards La Pêche in the afternoon. Route 923 runs to and from Gatineau during peak periods only. Route 925 runs three times in both directions daily — once in the morning, once in the afternoon, and once around noon.
925	Galeries de Hull	La Pêche	Chelsea, Centre Wakefield park and ride, Wakefield proper (route 923 only), La Pêche, Cégep de l'Outaouais (route 925 only)	Route 921 is an express service that mostly uses Autoroute 5. Route 921 runs twice daily towards Gatineau and once towards La Pêche in the afternoon. Route 923 runs to and from Gatineau during peak periods only. Route 925 runs three times in both directions daily — once in the morning, once in the afternoon, and once around noon.
NCC 924	Montcalm Rapibus station	La Pêche	NCC visitor centre, Gatineau Park, La Pêche	The NCC shuttle runs three times in each direction on weekends and holidays.
931	Cégep de l'Outaouais (Gabrielle-Roy campus)	Cantley		Both routes each run twice daily.
932	de la Gappe Rapibus station	Cantley		Both routes each run twice daily.
940	Labrosse Rapibus station	Perkins (Val-des-Monts)		Runs twice daily.

=== Fleet ===
Originally, the fleet had 11 vehicles, 7 of which were for the paratransit service; since then, that number has grown to 14 vehicles, most of which have bike racks and Wi-Fi.

=== Park-and-rides ===
The system has 12 park-and-rides, five of which have bus shelters.

== See also ==
- Société de transport de l'Outaouais
- Les Collines-de-l'Outaouais Regional County Municipality
- Pontiac Regional County Municipality
