= Txik Txak =

Northern Basque Country Transport Authority

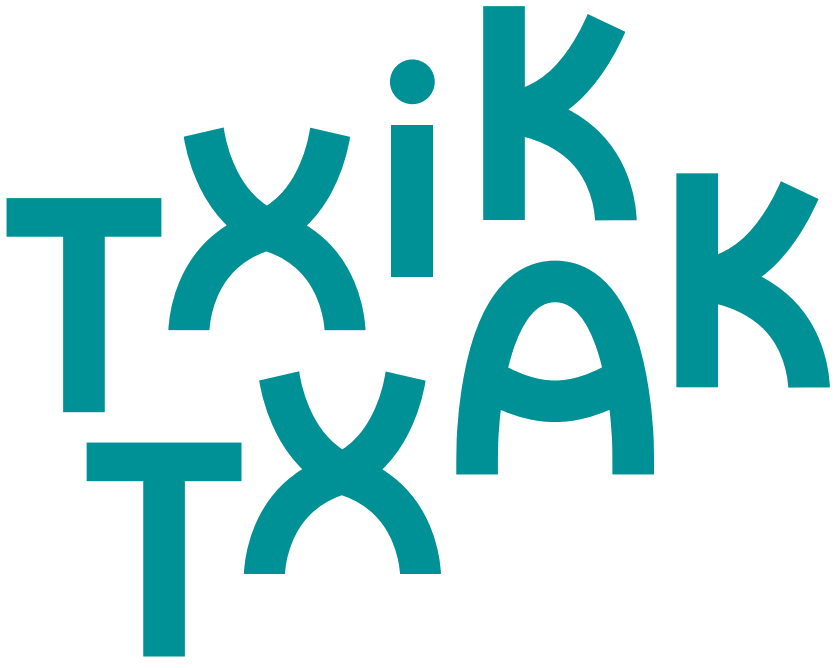

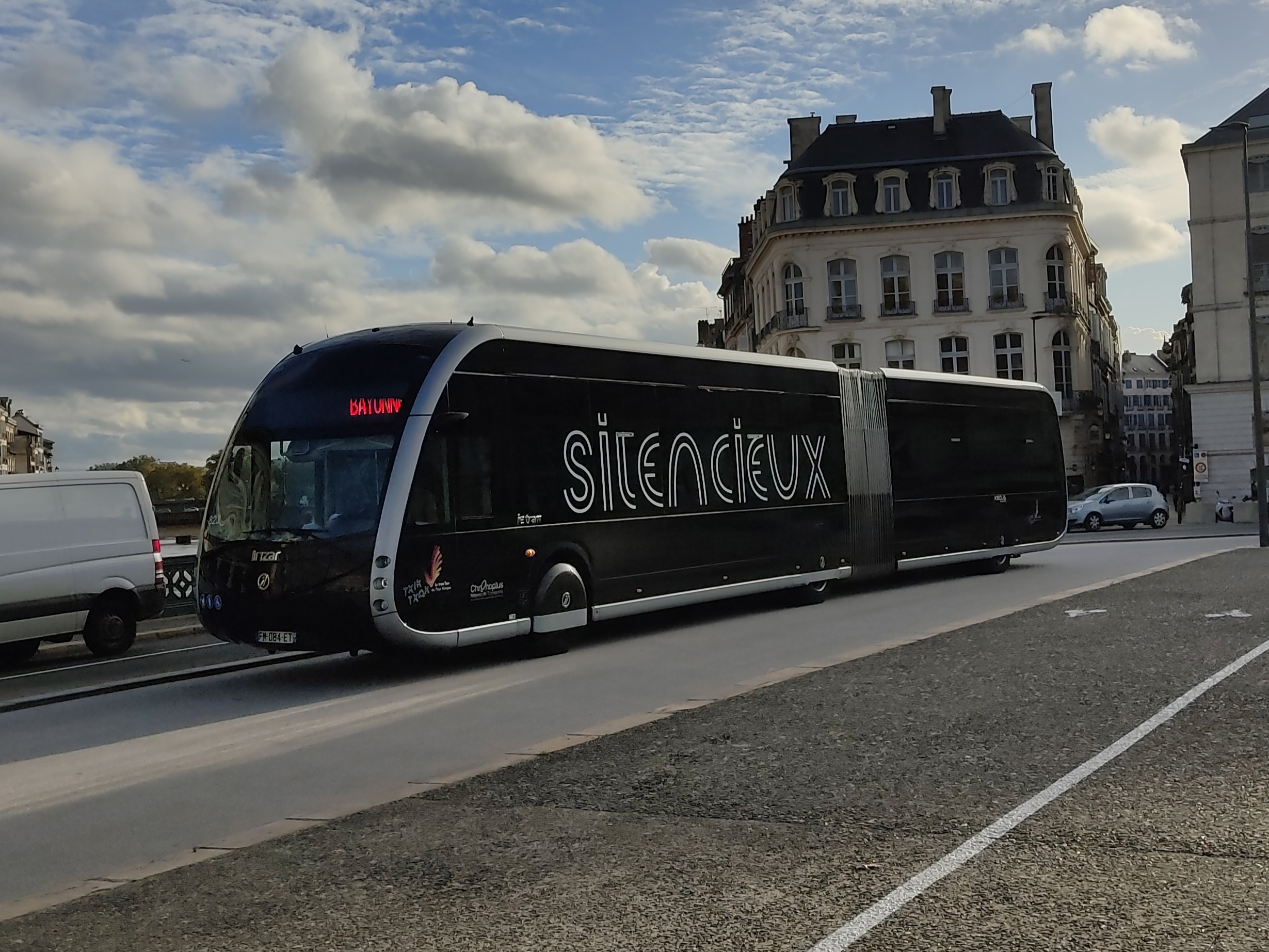
- Line 1 Tram'Bus in Bayonne

Overview
- Owner: Euskal Hirigune Elkargoa
- Locale: Northern Basque Country
- Transit type: Bus rapid transit Transit bus
- Website: www.txiktxak.eus

Operation
- Began operation: 2 September 2019
System map

Txik Txak (subtitled Ipar Euskal Herriko garaio sarea in Basque, les mobilités du Pays Basque in French and las mobilitats del País Basc in Occitan) is the new transport district of the Northern Basque Country, owned by Euskal Hirigune Elkargoa.

It opened on 2 September 2019, grouping all the precedent transport services such as Chronoplus, Hegobus, Transports 64 and Kintoa Mugi. It owns 2 rapid transit lines, 39 bus lines, 2 demand-transportation lines, 6 free navettes and 2 passeurs.

The name comes from the pelotari-used expression "txik txak", symbolizing the ball kicking the floor and then the fronton wall.
