= Klaipėda city passenger transport =

VŠĮ „Klaipėdos keleivinis transportas“
- Company type: Municipal owned
- Industry: Public transport
- Founded: 27 March 2003
- Headquarters: Klaipėda, Lithuania
- Area served: Klaipėda and western part of Klaipėda district municipality
- Key people: Gintaras Neniškis - director.
- Revenue: 34 609 928 Lt (2011)
- Number of employees: 29 (2011)
- Parent: Klaipėda Municipality
- Website: www.klaipedatransport.lt

Klaipėda city passenger transport (Lithuanian: Klaipėdos keleivinis transportas) is a Public Enterprise and public transport service organizing, supervising and coordinating body in Klaipėda city, Lithuania.

== History ==
Public Enterprise Klaipėda city passenger transport - was founded on March 27, 2003, by Klaipėda City Municipality Council Decision number 1-81. Klaipėda city passenger transport administration was granted an office located at Kalnupės g. 1, Klaipėda Klaipėda was the first among the major Lithuanian cities, which declined to obsolete outdated Hungarian Ikarus passenger busses. Klaipėda was a first city in Lithuania, which introduced electronic ticketing system in Lithianian public transport. In December 2009 Klaipėda city passenger transport headquarters moved from the old office at Kalnupės street 1 to the office at S. Daukanto street 15. Since 2010 On January 1, Klaipėda residents start providing monthly parking passes.

== International projects ==
Klaipėda city passenger transport is involved in the following international projects:

- MoCuBa,
- PROCEED,
- PIMMS Transfer.,
- BAY in TRAP.
