= Silesian Public Services Card =

2015–2023 electronic card in Poland

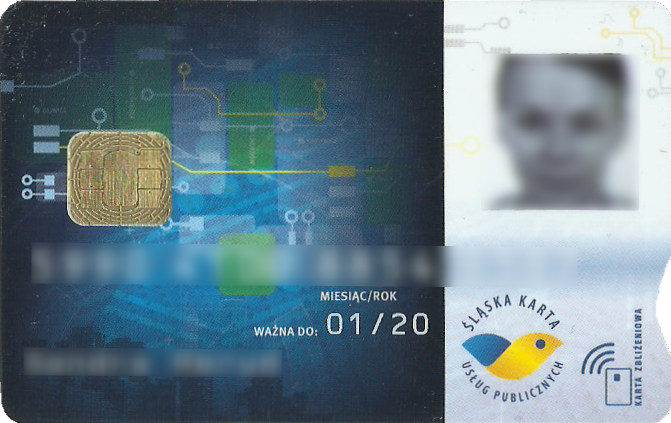
Front side of the card

Silesian Public Services Card was a contactless electronic card in operation from 2015 to 2023 in Poland, used for payments for public transport services organized by the Metropolitan Transport Authority (formerly Public Transport Association of the Upper Silesian Industrial District until the end of 2018), parking in paid parking zones in six cities of the Katowice urban area, as well as in cultural institutions, recreational and sports facilities, libraries, and municipal offices. The card was issued by mBank, with technical support provided by Asseco.

== History ==
=== Selection of the contractor ===
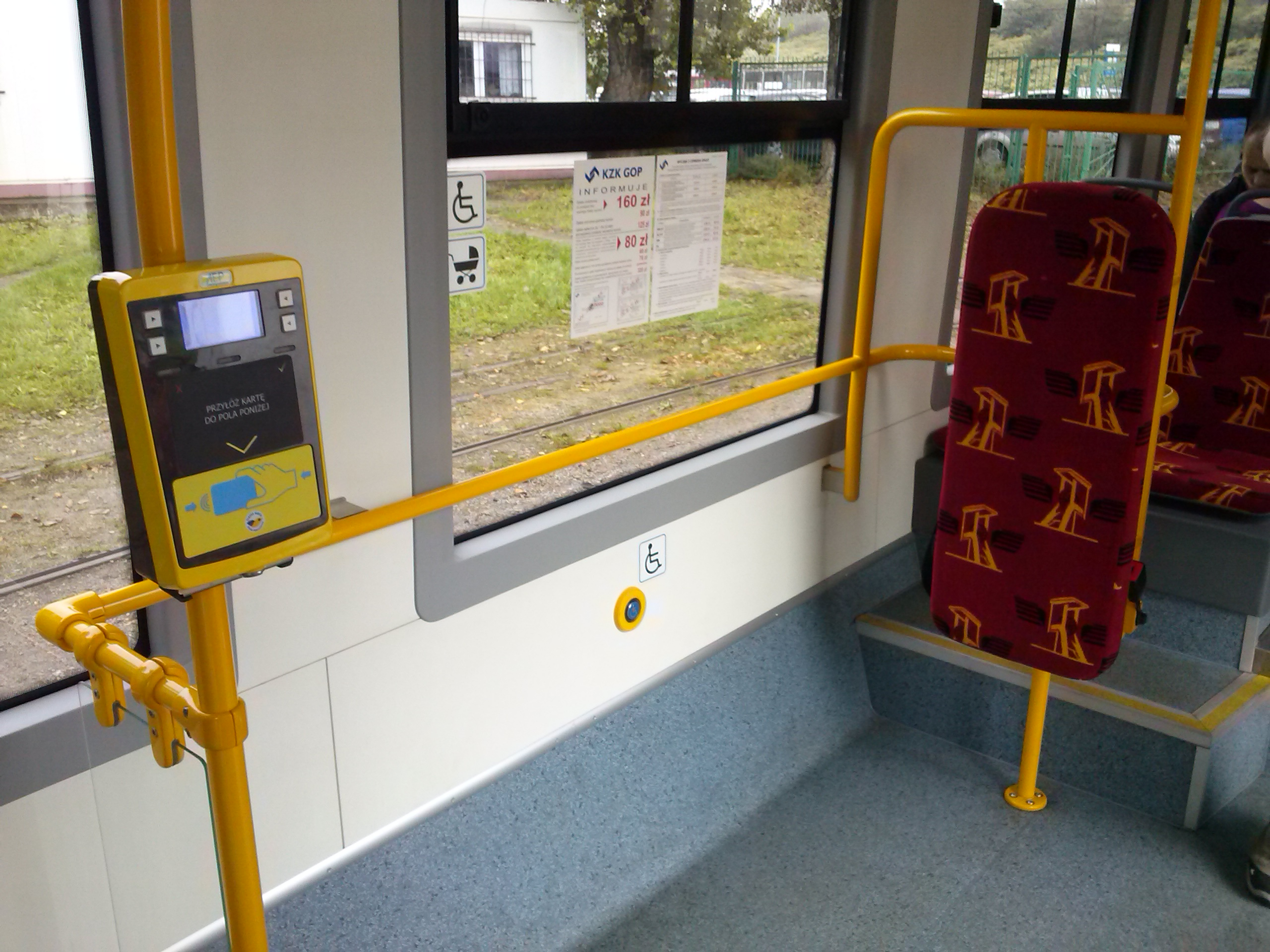
Reader in the Twist tram

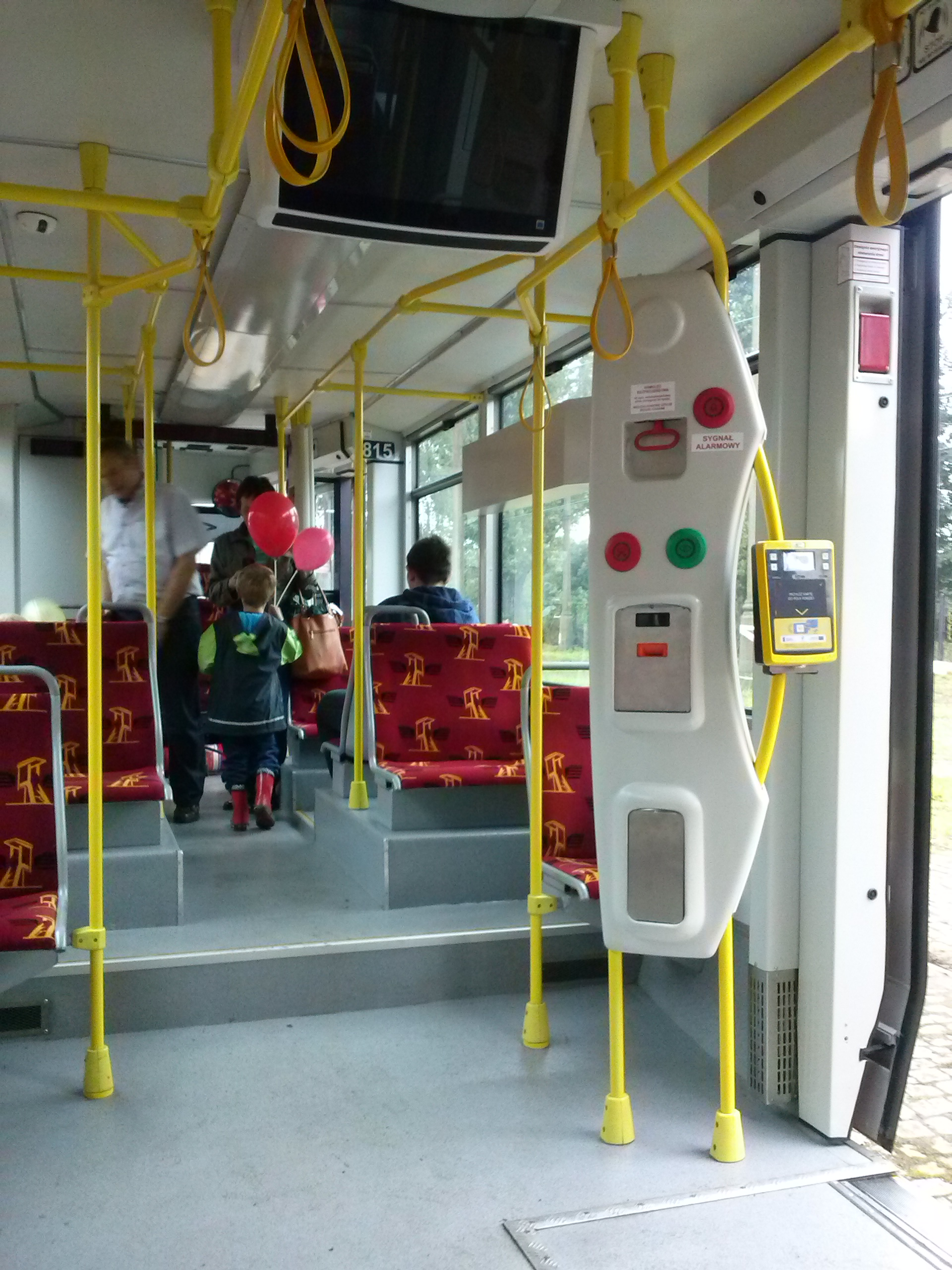
Reader in the Citadis tram

The idea of introducing a city card in the Katowice urban area first emerged in 2007. Two years later, the mayors of the cities in the area signed an agreement to begin work on the card's implementation. In November 2009, Public Transport Association of the Upper Silesian Industrial District announced a competition for the card's logo. The competition received 213 submissions, and the winning design featured a yellow-and-blue bird.

On 18 October 2010, the management of the Silesian Voivodeship signed an agreement with the Public Transport Association to co-finance the Silesian Public Services Card system under the Regional Operational Programme of the Silesian Voivodeship for 2007–2013, using funds from the European Regional Development Fund. In November 2010, Public Transport Association announced a tender for the delivery, implementation, and maintenance of the Silesian Public Services Card system. Two consortia submitted offers: Qumak, Polska Wytwórnia Papierów Wartościowych, and BRE Bank (197 million PLN net) and Comarch and SkyCash Poland (484 million PLN). The customer's budget was 160 million PLN.

In May 2011, the first consortium's offer was selected. However, Comarch appealed to the National Appeal Chamber, and the appeal was upheld on June 7. As a result, on June 28, Public Transport Association decided to annul the tender.

In July 2011, a new tender was announced. Three consortia submitted offers: Asseco and BRE Bank (189.6 million PLN), Comarch, ATM Systemy Informatyczne, mPay, and Getin Noble Bank (276.6 million PLN), and Qumak-Sekom, Polska Wytwórnia Papierów Wartościowych, and National Development Bank (209.7 million PLN). On October 4, Public Transport Association selected the first consortium's offer. The consortium led by Qumak appealed, and the National Appeal Commission upheld one of the six raised objections (related to Asseco's insurance), requiring Public Transport Association to reselect the offer. On November 9, the customer again selected the Asseco and BRE Bank consortium's offer. On 9 January 2012, an agreement was signed with them for the system's implementation. According to the plans at the time, the entire project was expected to be completed in 16 months.

=== Implementation ===
In April 2012, a portal dedicated to the Silesian Public Services Card was launched, and in June, the installation of card modules began in buses operating under the Public Transport Association's contract.

In the spring of 2013, the installation of card terminals at bus stops commenced, and in March 2014, they began to be gradually activated. Until the card's introduction, they were only used for the sale of Public Transport Association periodic tickets. In March 2015, the functionality of the terminals was expanded to include the sale of City Transport Authority in Tychy tickets.

At the end of 2014, the installation of new parking meters began in Bytom as part of the card project (the city had previously had a paid parking zone serviced by parking meters).

In May 2015, the first card parking meters were launched in Katowice (with the option to pay by card disabled). Prior to this, parking fees in the paid parking zones were collected by parking attendants.

On 3 August 2015, a paid parking zone was introduced in Gliwice. However, despite Gliwice being one of the cities involved in the card project, the parking meters in the city did not support payment by Silesian Public Services Cards.

In August 2015, internal system tests began. At that time, the system included:

- Client Portal,
- 40 Customer Service Points, including:
  - 35 operated by Kolporter Holding agents,
  - 5 operated by SKBank,
- 109 Stationary Card Recharge Terminals,
- 800 modules for payment collection and recharge at vendors,
- 223 parking meters,
- 410 modules for municipal service payments,
- 1,300 sets of devices across all vehicles,
- 320 devices for controllers,
- 20 Data Collection Points,
- Data Processing Center,
- Financial Settlement System.

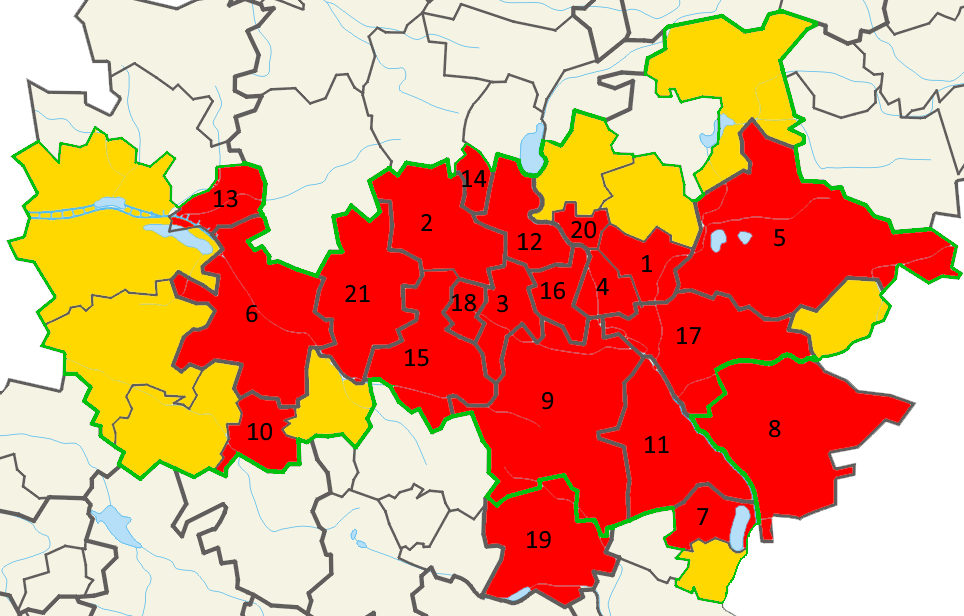
Participating cities Other cities of the Public Transport Association

At that time, 21 cities participated in the project:

1. Będzin,
2. Bytom,
3. Chorzów,
4. Czeladź,
5. Dąbrowa Górnicza,
6. Gliwice,
7. Imielin,
8. Jaworzno,
9. Katowice,
10. Knurów,
11. Mysłowice,
12. Piekary Śląskie,
13. Pyskowice,
14. Radzionków,
15. Ruda Śląska,
16. Siemianowice Śląskie,
17. Sosnowiec,
18. Świętochłowice,
19. Tychy,
20. Wojkowice,
21. Zabrze.

=== Operation ===
On 1 October 2015, the issuance of Silesian Public Services Cards began, and on November 1, the option to encode periodic tickets onto the card was introduced. Alongside this, a new ticket tariff was implemented, offering lower prices for electronic tickets compared to paper ones. In the initial weeks of operation, the card readers in buses frequently malfunctioned. Additionally, some vehicles, particularly those operating under Intermunicipal Passenger Transport Association in Tarnowskie Góry, which had a ticketing union with Public Transport Association, lacked any readers altogether.

On 2 November 2015, a paid parking zone was launched in Piekary Śląskie, allowing payments at Silesian Public Services Card parking meters (via cash or Silesian Public Services Cards). On the same day, Silesian Public Services Card parking meters were introduced in Tychy, replacing parking attendants who previously collected fees.

On 21 November 2015, the Financial Supervision Authority suspended the operations of SKBank, which had been one of the card issuance points. After a few days, these card issuance points reopened.

Between late November and early December 2015, the option to pay with Silesian Public Services Cards was activated in Katowice parking meters. Previously, these machines only accepted cash. On December 16, Silesian Public Services Card payments were activated in Bytom parking meters. Payments via Silesian Public Services Cards were also enabled in Chorzów and Zabrze, both of which had existing paid parking zones.

On 11 January 2016, Silesian Public Services Cards could be used to pay for single tickets. At the same time, a new distance-based tariff was introduced, along with changes to the zone-and-time tariff, making electronic tickets cheaper than paper ones.

By late February 2016, 32,000 Silesian Public Services Cards had been issued, and by early April, the number rose to 40,000.

On 1 May 2016, all time-based periodic tickets except for monthly personalized ones were withdrawn. On June 1, monthly network tickets, which allowed travel exclusively on bus or tram lines in two or more cities, were discontinued, leading to long queues at card issuance points. To address the situation, Public Transport Association extended the validity of May tickets until June 10. On July 1, monthly tickets valid for travel only within a single city on bus or tram lines were also withdrawn. By early July, 116,000 cards had been issued. On August 1, the last types of paper monthly tickets were removed from sale.

On 22 August 2016, an additional 41st Customer Service Point was opened in Tarnowskie Góry. In the first half of September, primary and middle school students in the Tarnowskie Góry service area were temporarily exempted from the requirement to have tickets for travel to and from school due to delays in card issuance.

By mid-September 2016, 190,000 cards had been issued, and by October 10, the number had increased to 207,000.

At the end of 2016, due to delays in the system's implementation, Public Transport Association imposed an 18 million PLN penalty on the contractor, along with an additional 400,000 PLN for malfunctions in the system.

=== Expansion of the cards and the creation of the Metropolitan Transport Authority ===
On 16 February 2017, the authorities of Sosnowiec signed an agreement with nextbike for the development of the Sosnowiec City Bike system. This agreement included the option to pay for bike rentals using the Silesian Public Services Card.

In March 2017, Silesian Railways submitted an application for a grant to join the Silesian Public Services Card system. By the end of December 2017, Public Transport Association, together with Tychy and Bieruń, announced a tender for equipping buses operating under Tychy with Silesian Public Services Card devices and for the installation of 462 passenger dynamic information boards. At the end of August 2018, a contract was signed with the company Dysten to carry out the investment, and installation began in March.

On 1 January 2019, the responsibility for public transport in the Metropolis GZM was taken over by the Metropolitan Transport Authority, replacing Public Transport Association. As a result, it took over supervision of the Silesian Public Services Card system. A few days later, the Metropolis GZM announced a technical dialogue for "a new public service fee collection system, particularly for public mass transit in the Metropolis GZM".

By early 2020, the installation of Silesian Public Services Card validators in Tychy buses and trolleybuses was completed. The new validators were equipped with the ability to accept contactless card payments, a feature not available in previously installed validators. On 10 April 2020, the Mobile Silesian Public Services Card application was launched, allowing users to encode purchased periodic tickets onto their cards, check schedules, and report malfunctions.

In April 2020, 50 additional Silesian Public Services Card parking meters were installed in Katowice, with the capability to accept payments via Silesian Public Services Cards.

=== Silesian Public Services Card 1.5 ===
On 28 December 2020, the Metropolis GZM announced a tender for "Silesian Public Services Card 1.5 – Modernization of the Public Transport Fare Collection System". The planned changes included the following updates to the system:

- operation in online mode instead of offline,
- the card would serve only as an identifier for data, not as the data carrier,
- the mobile application would become the core of the system,
- automatic activation of purchased tickets,
- elimination of the need to visit a Customer Service Point to set up an account.

=== Hacker attack ===
On 8 February 2023, a hacker attack occurred, causing the Silesian Public Services Card system and the Passenger Dynamic Information System to completely stop functioning. On February 20, it was reported that the effects of the hacker attack had been resolved.

=== Transport GZM application ===
On 7 August 2023, the Transport GZM mobile application was launched, replacing the Silesian Public Services Card system. As a result, Silesian Public Services Card was completely deactivated on 28 September 2023.

== Functions of the card ==
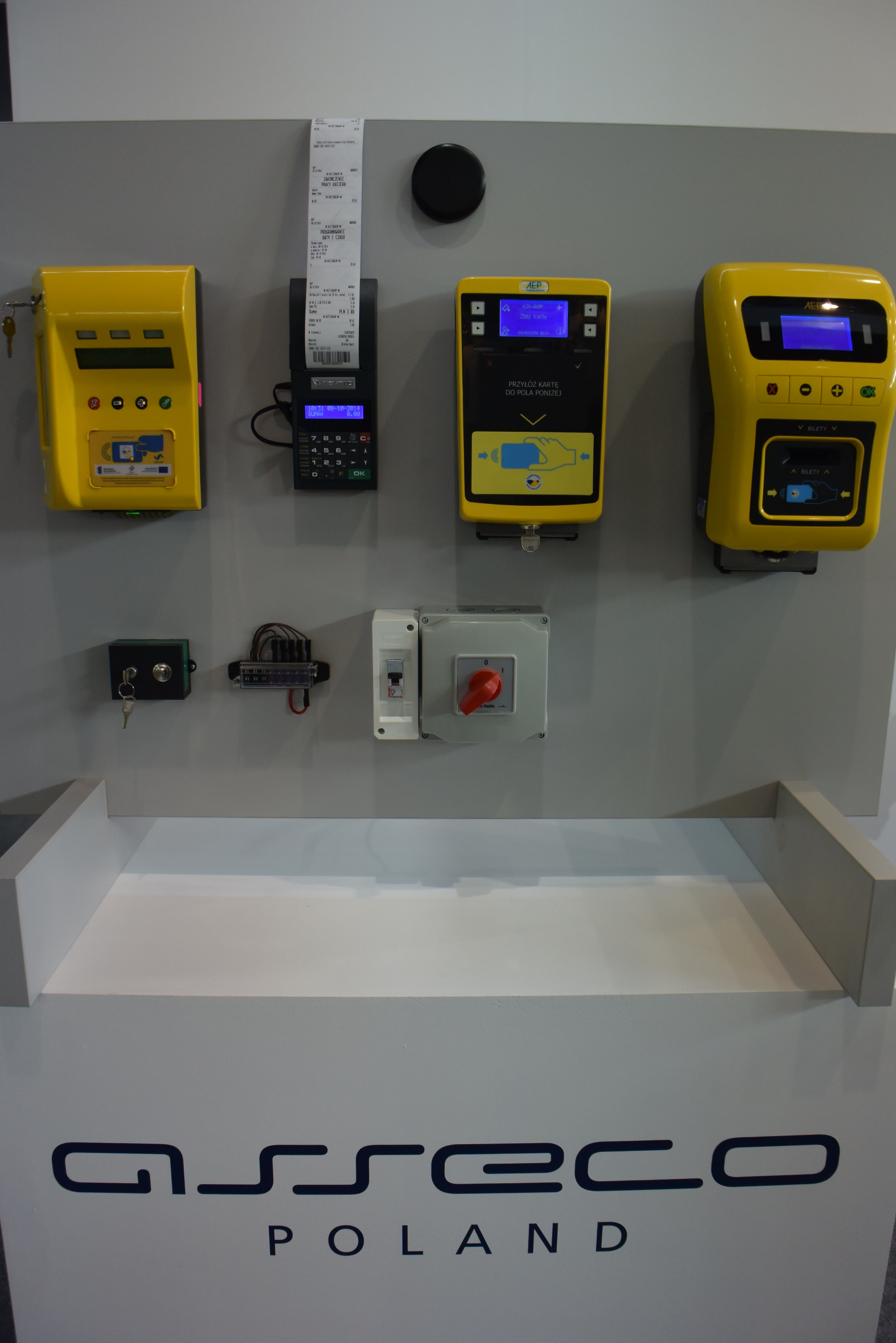
Various Silesian Public Services Card devices

Silesian Public Services Card was used for the following purposes:

- coding of period tickets for the Metropolitan Transport Authority,
- payment for parking in Bytom, Chorzów, Katowice, Piekary Śląskie, Tychy, and Zabrze,
- payments in recreational and sports facilities (such as swimming pools, ice rinks, tennis courts, and multi-purpose sports halls),
- payments in libraries,
- payments in city offices,
- logging into city bike rental stations.

== Criticism ==
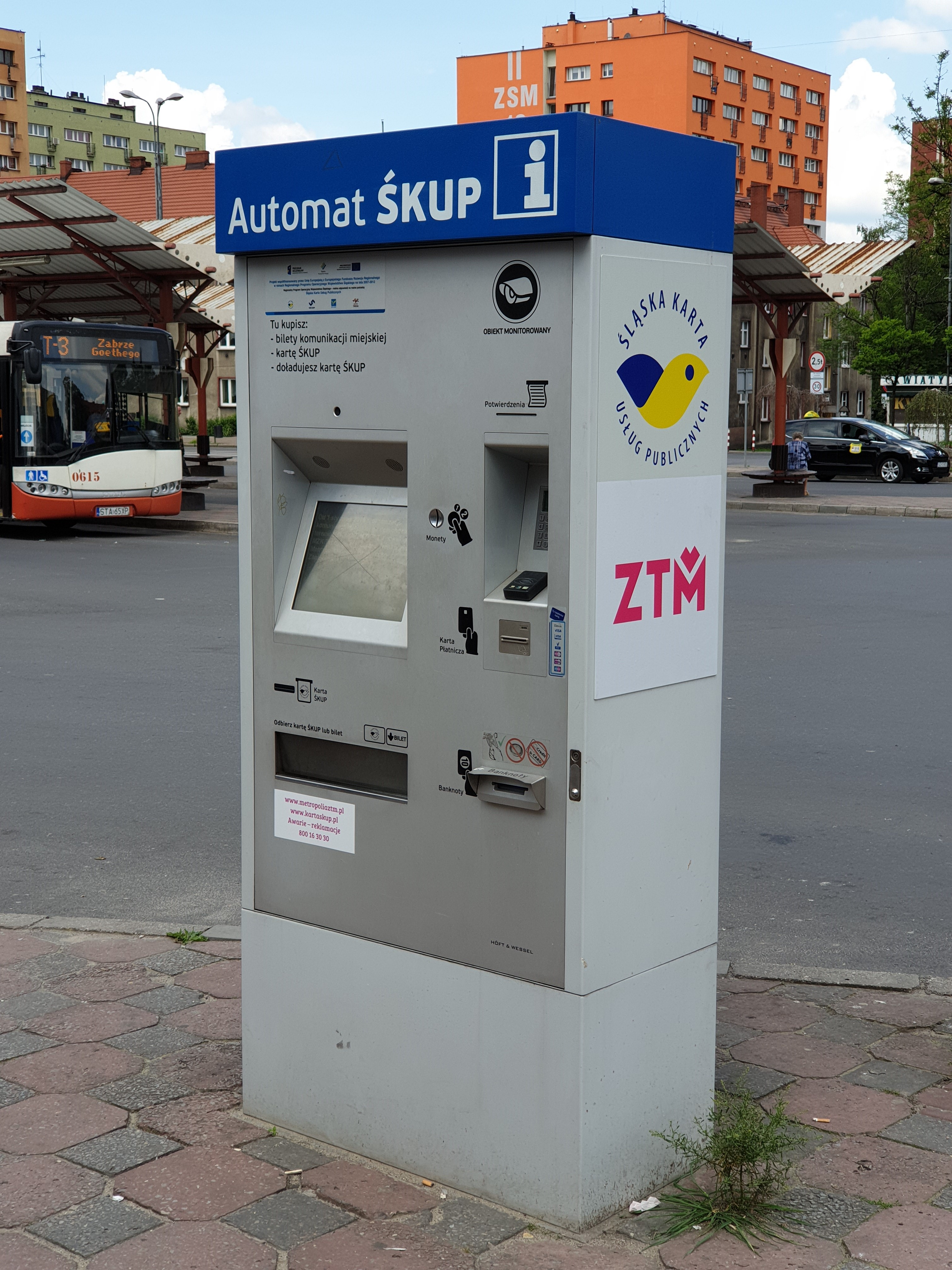
Automat of the Silesian Public Services Card at Goethe station in Zabrze

The system faced criticism for several reasons, including:

- the requirement for periodic ticket holders to register each boarding, with passengers who failed to do so being treated as fare evaders,
- frequent malfunctions of card readers and the website, errors in coding, and disappearing tickets or funds from the card,
- the complexity of using the card and the readers (such as the lack of automatic selection of the most advantageous fare),
- the limited use of terminals in places like libraries and swimming pools.

Due to the mandatory registration of vehicle entry, several complaints were submitted to the Office of Competition and Consumer Protection. As a result, the office urged Public Transport Association to remove this requirement. After an investigation, on 16 November 2017, the office sent a notice to Public Transport Association, initiating proceedings over violations of collective consumer interests. Eventually, in January 2018, Public Transport Association lifted the obligation for holders of unlimited-ride period tickets to register entry into vehicles.

In 2018, the Central Anticorruption Bureau conducted an audit on the outsourcing of additional services related to monitoring transport operators and the implementation and maintenance of the Silesian Public Services Card project. The audit revealed that nearly 3 million PLN was spent on fiscal printers for printing ticket purchase receipts that were never used.
