= Red Bus (Mendoza) =

Payment system

Red bus contactless smart card

Red Bus was implemented in Mendoza, Argentina in August 2006, for the payment of the public transport (including buses and trolley). The system mixes payment by cash with a Mifare contactless smart card.
The system was first implemented in the city of Córdoba, then in Mendoza and recently in the city of Salta.
