= Smartcards on National Rail =

Contactless smartcards

The symbol used on smartcards issued by National Rail train operating companies

Contactless smartcards are being progressively introduced as an alternative option to paper ticketing on the National Rail system of Great Britain. Tickets for use on National Rail services can be loaded onto any ITSO card.

The ITSO standard has been developed to cover all types of public transport. It has been included as a requirement by the Department for Transport for all new rail franchises in the last few years. It is also the format that the English National Concessionary Travel Scheme (ENCTS) concessionary passes and rail staff passes are issued in.

Three train operating companies have launched pay-as-you-go systems where fares are automatically deducted by touching-in-and-out ITSO cards at the start and end of the journey. Branded as keyGo on Govia Thameslink Railway (GTR) and Tap2Go on South Western Railway (SWR), they require use of GTR's The Key and SWR's Touch smartcard respectively. Great Western Railway (GWR) also launched a pay-as-you-go system called GWR PAYG in August 2022, which requires the use of the GWR Touch smartcard. Transport for Wales (TFW/TrC) have also started rolling out a Pay-as-you-go system using EMV cards from February 7, 2024 across South East Wales.

The first large scale adoption of smartcards for transport in Great Britain was by Transport for London (TfL) with the Oyster card. It was initially only available on TfL services, but it has been progressively rolled out to National Rail services in and around Greater London. ITSO cards can also now be used on Oyster card readers.

Support for smartcards and mobile apps as of August 2026
Train operating company	Smartcard issued	Routes supported by smartcards for:				
Train operating company	Smartcard issued	Season tickets	Pay-as-you-go		Single, Return and Day Travelcards loaded to the card	Concessionary passes
Train operating company	Smartcard issued	Season tickets	Smartcards and mobile apps	EMV credit / debit cards, Apple Pay, Google Pay and Samsung Pay	Single, Return and Day Travelcards loaded to the card	Concessionary passes
Avanti West Coast	Avanti West Coast Smartcard	London Euston to Watford Junction (Oyster) London Euston to Boundary Zone 6 (Travelcards on ITSO) Northampton to Stafford and Shrewsbury via Birmingham (Swift ITSO)	None	None	None	No Greater London acceptance Coventry to Wolverhampton (Network West Midlands ENCTS)
c2c	c2c Smart	London Fenchurch Street and Liverpool Street to Upminster and Rainham (Oyster) London Fenchurch Street and Liverpool Street to Upminster and Rainham (Travelcards on ITSO) All stations (c2c smart ITSO)	London Fenchurch Street and Liverpool Street to Upminster and Grays (Oyster)	All stations (CPAY)	All stations (c2c smart ITSO)	London Fenchurch Street and Liverpool Street to Upminster and Rainham (Freedom Pass)
Caledonian Sleeper	Does not issue its own smartcard	Glasgow to Fort William and Kingussie to Inverness (ScotRail Smartcard ITSO)	None	None	None	None
Chiltern Railways	Chiltern Railways Smartcard	London Marylebone to West Ruislip and Amersham (Oyster) All stations(Chiltern smartcard ITSO) Leamington Spa to Kidderminster (Swift ITSO) London Marylebone to West Ruislip and Harrow-on-the-Hill (Travelcards on ITSO)	London Marylebone to West Ruislip and Amersham (Oyster)	London Marylebone to Princes Risborough and Aylesbury Vale Parkway (CPAY)	London Marylebone to West Ruislip and Amersham (Travelcards on ITSO)	London Marylebone to West Ruislip and Amersham (Freedom Pass) Dorridge to Stourbridge Junction (Network West Midlands ENCTS)
CrossCountry	CrossCountry Smartcard	Some Crosscountry journeys (ITSO) Basingstoke to Bournemouth (SWR ITSO Smartcard) Nottingham to Sheffield (EMT Stagecoach Smart ITSO) Leamington Spa to Stafford (Swift ITSO) Doncaster to Sheffield (SY smartcard ITSO) Wakefield Westgate to Leeds (MCard ITSO) Beeston to Nottingham (Kangaroo ITSO) Proposed: Winchester to Southampton Central (Solent go ITSO)	Cheltenham Spa to Weston-super-Mare (GWR PAYG ITSO) Plymouth to Penzance (GWR PAYG ITSO) Being trialled:; Derby to Nottingham (EMR PAYG)	Newport to Cardiff Central (TfW EMV)	Basingstoke to Bournemouth (SWR ITSO Smartcard) Nottingham to Sheffield (EMT Stagecoach Smart ITSO)	Coventry to Wolverhampton (Network West Midlands ENCTS)
East Midlands Railway	EMR Smartcard	London St Pancras to Boundary Zone 6 (Oyster) London St Pancras to Boundary Zone 6 (Travelcards on ITSO) London St Pancras to Bedford (The Key ITSO) London St Pancras to Sheffield (not at Luton Airport Parkway, Luton, Bedford, Attenborough, Spondon, Langley Mill or Dronfield); Nottingham to Mansfield Woodhouse (not at Newstead) (EMR ITSO) Attenborough to Bulwell and Carlton (Kangaroo ITSO) Wakefield Westgate to Leeds (MCard ITSO) Dore & Totley to Doncaster (SY smartcard ITSO) To be announced: At Luton Airport Parkway, Luton and Bedford (EMRt ITSO) Proposed: Hazel Grove to Irlam (Get Me There ITSO) Proposed: Nottingham to Lincoln (not at intermediate stations) (EMT Stagecoach Smart ITSO) Projected: Liverpool Lime Street to Liverpool South Parkway (Walrus ITSO)	Proposed: Wellingborough and Kettering to London St Pancras (EMR ITSO) Being trialled:; Leicester to Derby and Nottingham (EMR PAYG)	St Pancras International to Luton (CPAY)	London St Pancras to Sheffield (not at Luton Airport Parkway, Luton, Bedford, Attenborough, Spondon, Langley Mill or Dronfield); Nottingham to Mansfield Woodhouse (not at Newstead) (EMR ITSO) Liverpool Lime Street to Liverpool South Parkway (Walrus ITSO)	No Greater London acceptance Hazel Grove to Irlam (TfGM ENCTS) Liverpool Lime Street to Liverpool South Parkway/Hunts Cross (Merseyside ENCTS)
Elizabeth line	Transport for London Oyster card	Abbey Wood and Shenfield to West Drayton and Heathrow Airport (Oyster) Abbey Wood and Shenfield to West Drayton and Heathrow Airport (Travelcards on ITSO)	Abbey Wood and Shenfield to West Drayton and Heathrow Airport (Oyster)	All stations (CPAY)	Abbey Wood and Shenfield to West Drayton and Heathrow Airport(Travelcards on ITSO)	All stations (Freedom Pass)
Gatwick Express (brand of Govia Thameslink Railway)	Does not issue its own smartcard	London Victoria to Boundary Zone 6 (Oyster) London Victoria to Boundary Zone 6 (Travelcards on ITSO) Gatwick Airport to London Victoria (The Key (ITSO))	London Victoria to Gatwick Airport (Oyster) All stations (keyGo on The Key (ITSO))	All stations (CPAY)	Gatwick Airport to London Victoria (The Key (ITSO)) Projected: London Victoria to Gatwick Airport (The Key (ITSO))	None
Greater Anglia	Greater Anglia Smart Card	London Liverpool Street to Hertford East and Shenfield (Oyster); London Liverpool Street to Harold Wood, Edmonton Green and Enfield Lock (Travelcards on ITSO) All stations (except Shippea Hill, Lakenheath, Haring Road, Eccles Road, Spooner Row, Salhouse, Brundall Gardens, Buckenham, Somerleyton and Berney Arms) (ITSO) Cambridge to King's Lynn (The Key ITSO)	London Liverpool Street to Hertford East and Shenfield (Oyster)	London Liverpool Street to Stansted Airport, Witham and Southend Victoria (CPAY)	London Liverpool Street to Edmonton Green, Enfield Lock and Harold Wood (Travelcards on ITSO)	London Liverpool Street to Edmonton Green, Enfield Lock and Harold Wood (Freedom Pass)
Grand Central	Does not issue its own smartcard	London Kings Cross to Boundary Zone 6 (Oyster) London Kings Cross to Boundary Zone 6 (Travelcards on ITSO) Pontefract Monkhill to Bradford Interchange (MCard ITSO)	None	None	None	None
Great Western Railway	GWR Touch	Paddington to West Drayton and Greenford (Oyster) Upwey to Weymouth; Ash to Guildford (SWR ITSO Smartcard) Worcester Foregate Street to Hereford (Swift ITSO) Dorking (Deepdene) to Gatwick Airport; Brighton to Chichester (The Key (ITSO)) Paddington to West Drayton and Greenford (Travelcards on ITSO) All GWR stations (Touch ITSO)	Paddington to West Drayton and Greenford; Redhill to Gatwick Airport (Oyster) Area bounded by Ashchurch for Tewkesbury, Swindon, Freshford, Weston-Super-Mare, Seven Beach and Patchway (ITSO) Gunnislake, Looe and Plymouth to Penzance, Falmouth Docks and St. Ives (ITSO) Gatwick Airport to Dorking Deepdene (keyGo on The Key (ITSO))	Paddington to Greenford, Windsor & Eton Central, Henley-on-Thames, Marlow and Reading; Reigate to Gatwick Airport (CPAY)	Upwey to Weymouth; Ash to Guildford (SWR ITSO Smartcard) Dorking (Deepdene) to Gatwick Airport; Brighton to Chichester (The Key (ITSO)) Paddington to West Drayton and Greenford (Travelcards on ITSO)	Paddington to West Drayton and Greenford (Freedom Pass)
Great Northern (brand of Govia Thameslink Railway)	The Key	London Kings Cross and Moorgate to Hadley Wood and Crews Hill (Oyster) London Kings Cross and Moorgate to Hadley Wood and Crews Hill (Travelcards on ITSO) London Kings Cross and Moorgate to Huntingdon and King's Lynn Cambridge to Cambridge North (Abellio Greater Anglia ITSO) Projected: Huntingdon to Peterborough;	London Kings Cross and Moorgate to Potter Bar and Hertford North (Oyster) London Kings Cross and Moorgate to Huntingdon and Foxton (keyGo on The Key (ITSO))	London Kings Cross and Moorgate to Baldock (CPAY)	London Kings Cross and Moorgate to Hadley Wood and Crews Hill (Travelcards on ITSO)	London Kings Cross and Moorgate to Hadley Wood and Crews Hill (Freedom Pass)
Heathrow Express	Does not issue its own smartcard	Heathrow Terminal 5 to Heathrow Terminals 2 & 3 (Oyster) Heathrow Terminal 5 to Heathrow Terminals 2 & 3 (Travelcards on ITSO)	All stations (Oyster)	All stations (CPAY)	Heathrow Terminal 5 to Heathrow Terminals 2 & 3 (Travelcards on ITSO)	None
Hull Trains	Does not issue its own smartcard	London Kings Cross to Boundary Zone 6 (Oyster) London Kings Cross to Boundary Zone 6 (Travelcards on ITSO)	None	None	None	None
London North Eastern Railway	LNER Smartcard	London Kings Cross to Boundary Zone 6 (Oyster) London Kings Cross to Boundary Zone 6 (Travelcards on ITSO) Wakefield Westgate to Leeds (MCard ITSO) London Kings Cross to Stevenage (The Key ITSO) Somer LNER routes Dunbar to Aberdeen, Glasgow Central and Inverness (ScotRail Smartcard ITSO)	None	None	None	None
London Northwestern Railway (brand of West Midlands Trains)	London Northwestern Railway Smartcard	London Euston to Watford Junction (Oyster) London Euston to Harrow & Wealdstone (Travelcards on ITSO) London Euston to Long Buckby, St Albans Abbey & Bedford (LNW Smartcard ITSO) Northampton to Stafford via Birmingham (Swift ITSO) Liverpool Lime Street to Liverpool South Parkway (Walrus ITSO)	London Euston to Watford Junction (Oyster)	London Euston to Bletchley and St Albans Abbey (CPAY)	London Euston to Harrow & Wealdstone (Travelcards on ITSO) Liverpool Lime Street to Liverpool South Parkway (Walrus ITSO)	Liverpool Lime Street to Liverpool South Parkway/Hunts Cross (Merseyside ENCTS) London Euston to Harrow & Wealdstone (Freedom Pass) Coventry to Wolverhampton; (Network West Midlands ENCTS)
London Overground	Transport for London Oyster card	All stations (Oyster) All stations (Travelcards on ITSO)	All stations (Oyster)	All stations (CPAY)	All stations (Travelcards on ITSO)	All stations (Freedom Pass)
Merseyrail	Merseytravel MetroSmart	None	All stations (Tap&Go)	All stations except Chester (Tap & Go)	All stations (Merseytravel Saveaways on MetrosmartITSO)	All stations (Merseyside ENCTS)
Northern	Northern Smart	Dore & Totley and Kiveton Park to Denby Dale, Darton, Moorthorpe, South Elmsall, Thorne North and Thorne South (SY smartcard ITSO) Walsden, Marsden, Denby Dale, Darton, Moorthorpe, South Elmsall and Knottingley to Steeton & Silsden, Horsforth, Micklefield and Pontefract Baghill (MCard ITSO) Nottingham to Sheffield (not at Langley Mill or Dronfield)(EMR ITSO) Newcastle to Sunderland (Popcard ITSO) Liverpool Lime Street to Garswood, Hough Green and Newton-le-Willows; Kirkby to Rainford; Southport to Meols Cop (Walrus ITSO) Proposed: Bromley Cross, Blackrod, Appley Bridge, Orrell, Bryn, Patricroft and Glazebrook to Hale, Manchester Airport, Bramhall, Middlewood, Strines, Glossop, Hadfield, Greenfield and Littleborough (Get Me There ITSO)	Newcastle to Ashington (Popcard ITSO) Being trialled: Harrogate to Leeds; Sheffield to Doncaster; Sheffield to Barnsley (Northern PAYG)	Proposed: Manchester Victoria to Stalybridge; Manchester Piccadilly to Glossop and Hadfield	Nottingham to Sheffield (not at Langley Mill or Dronfield) (EMR ITSO) Liverpool Lime Street to Garswood, Hough Green and Newton-le-Willows; Kirkby to Rainford; Southport to Meols Cop (Walrus ITSO)	Liverpool Lime Street to Garswood, Hough Green and Newton-le-Willows; Kirkby to Rainford; Southport to Meols Cop (Merseyside ENCTS) Bromley Cross, Blackrod, Appley Bridge, Orrell, Bryn, Patricroft and Glazebrook to Hale, Manchester Airport, Bramhall, Middlewood, Strines, Glossop, Hadfield, Greenfield and Littleborough (TfGM ENCTS)
ScotRail	ScotRail Smartcard	All ScotRail services except Carlisle to Newcastle (ITSO)	Area bounded by Milngavie, Balloch, Helensburgh Central, Gourock, Wemyss Bay, Largs, Ardrossan Harbour, Ayr, New Cumnock, Neilstom, East Kilbride, Larkhall, Lanark, Carstairs, Edinburgh Waverley and Falkirk Grahamston (Scotrail Tap & Pay app)	None	Certain routes (ITSO) Planned: All routes ( ITSO)	None
South Western Railway	SWR Touch	London Waterloo to Feltham, Hampton, Surbiton, Hampton Court, Chessington South and Ewell West (Oyster) All stations except Ewell West to Bookham (SWR ITSO Smartcard) Dorking to London Waterloo (not at intermediate stations between Epsom and Vauxhall) (The Key (ITSO)) London Waterloo to Feltham, Hampton, Surbiton, Hampton Court, Chessington South and Ewell West (Travelcards on ITSO) Proposed: Winchester and Rowland's Castle to Portsmouth Harbour, Romsey and Ashurst (New Forest) (Solent go ITSO)	London Waterloo to Feltham, Hampton, Surbiton, Hampton Court, Chessington South and Epsom (Oyster) All SWR served stations except Westbury, Frome, Bruton, Castle Cary, Yeovil Pen Mill, Warminster, Dorking to London Victoria and London Bridge. (Tap2Go) (ITSO))	London Waterloo to Virginia Water and Windsor & Eton Riverside Shepperton, Surbiton, Hampton Court, Chessington South and Epsom (CPAY)	All stations except Ewell West to Bookham (SWR ITSO Smartcard) Dorking to Epsom and FROM Epsom TO London Waterloo (The Key (ITSO)) London Waterloo to Feltham, Hampton, Surbiton, Hampton Court, Chessington South and Epsom (Travelcards on ITSO)	London Waterloo to Feltham, Hampton, Surbiton, Hampton Court, Chessington South and Ewell West (Freedom Pass)
Southern (brand of Govia Thameslink Railway)	The Key	London Bridge and London Victoria to Epsom, Coulsdon South and Upper Warlingham; Clapham Junction to Watford Junction (Oyster) All stations except Harrow & Wealdstone to Milton Keynes Central (The Key (ITSO)) London Bridge and London Victoria to Epsom, Coulsdon South and Upper Warlingham; Clapham Junction to Harrow & Wealstone (Travelcards on ITSO) Eastleigh to Southampton Central (SWR ITSO Smartcard) Proposed: Emsworth to Portsmouth Harbour and Southampton Central (Solent go ITSO)	Watford Junction, London Bridge and London Victoria to Epsom, Gatwick Airport and Upper Warlingham (Oyster) East Grinstead, Uckfield, Reigate, Littlehampton, Bognor Regis, Warblington, Seaford and Bexhill to Harrow & Wealdstone, London Bridge & London Victoria (keyGo on The Key (ITSO)) Dorking to London Victoria and London Bridge (Tap2Go) (ITSO))	Hemel Hempstead, London Bridge and London Victoria to Dorking, Reigate Gatwick Airport and East Grinstead (CPAY)	All stations except Harrow & Wealdstone to Milton Keynes Central (The Key (ITSO)) Eastleigh to Southampton Central (SWR ITSO Smartcard) London Bridge and London Victoria to Epsom, Coulsdon South and Upper Warlingham; Clapham Junction to Harrow & Wealdstone (Travelcards on ITSO)	London Bridge and London Victoria to Ewell East, Coulsdon South and Upper Warlingham; Clapham Junction to Harrow & Wealdstone (Freedom Pass)
Southeastern	The Key	City Thameslink, London Charing Cross and London Victoria to Dartford, Swanley and Knockholt (Oyster) City Thameslink, London Charing Cross and London Victoria to Dartford, Swanley and Knockholt (Travelcards on ITSO) All stations (The Key (ITSO))	City Thameslink, London Charing Cross and London Victoria to Dartford, Swanley and Knockholt; London St Pancras to Stratford International (Oyster)	City Thameslink, London Charing Cross and London Victoria to Dartford and Sevenoaks; London St Pancras to Stratford International (CPAY)	From Southern stations outside Greater London TO London Bridge, London Cannon Street, London Waterloo East and London Charing Cross (break of journey only at intermediate stations within Greater London) (The Key (ITSO)) City Thameslink, London Charing Cross and London Victoria to Dartford, Swanley and Knockholt (Travelcards on ITSO)	City Thameslink, London Charing Cross and London Victoria to Dartford, Swanley and Knockholt (Freedom Pass)
Thameslink (brand of Govia Thameslink Railway)	The Key	Sevenoaks to St Pancras International (The Key (ITSO)) Dartford, Swanley and Coulsdon South to Elstree & Borehamwood and New Barnet (Oyster) All stations except Peterborough (The Key (ITSO)) East Croydon, Dartford to Elstree & Borehamwood and New Barnet (Travelcards on ITSO)	Dartford, Swanley, Sutton and Gatwick Airport to Radlett and Potters Bar (Oyster) Sutton, Brighton and St. Mary Cray to Bedford, Huntingdon and Foxton (KeyGo on the Key)	Dartford, Sevenoaks, Sutton and Gatwick Airport to Harlington and Baldock (CPAY)	East Croydon, Dartford and Swanley to Elstree & Borehamwood and New Barnet (Travelcards on ITSO)	Dartford, Swanley and Coulsdon South to Elstree & Borehamwood and New Barnet (Freedom Pass)
TransPennine Express	TransPennine Express Smart	Dore & Totley to Doncaster (SY smartcard ITSO) Huddersfield to Garforth (MCard ITSO) Projected: Liverpool Lime Street to Liverpool South Parkway (Walrus ITSO) TBA: Bolton to Stalybridge and Stockport (Get Me There ITSO)	None	Proposed: Manchester Victoria to Stalybridge	Liverpool Lime Street to Liverpool South Parkway (Walrus ITSO)	Bolton to Stalybridge and Stockport (TfGM ENCTS) Liverpool Lime Street to Liverpool South Parkway (Merseyside ENCTS)
Transport for Wales Rail	Transport for Wales Smartcard	Wrexham to Aberystwyth; Cardiff to Radyr, Cardiff Bay, Barry Island, Swansea, Aberdare, Treherbert, Ebbw Vale Parkway, Merthyr Tydfil, and Maesteg, Severn Tunnel Junction (TfW ITSO Smartcard) Stafford and Shrewsbury to Birmingham International (Swift ITSO) Bidston to Heswall; Earlestown to Newton-le-Willows (Walrus ITSO) Proposed: Stockport to Manchester Oxford Road (Get Me There ITSO)	Gloucester to Cheltenham Spa (ITSO)	Area bounded by: Pyle, Maesteg, Treherbert, Aberdare, Merthyr Tydfil, Coryton, Rhymney, Ebbw Vale Town, Abergavenny, Chepstow, Cardiff Bay, Penarth and Barry Island; Bidston to Wrexham Central ; Rhyl to Gobowen and Runcorn East (TfW EMV)	Bidston to Heswall; Earlestown to Newton-le-Willows (Walrus ITSO)	Wolverhampton to Birmingham International (Network West Midlands ENCTS) Bidston to Heswall; Newton-le-Willows to Earlestown (Merseyside ENCTS) Stockport to Manchester Oxford Road (TfGM ENCTS)
West Midlands Railway (brand of West Midlands Trains)	Transport for West Midlands Swift card	All stations except Coventry Arena to Nuneaton (Swift ITSO)	None	None	None	Coventry to Wolverhampton; Blake Street to Longbridge; Dorridge and Earlswood to Stourbridge Junction; Birmingham New Street to Bloxwich North, and at Hednesford (Network West Midlands ENCTS)

== See also ==
- Oyster card
- CPAY (TfL contactless payment)
- Project Oval
