= Smartcards on buses and trams in Great Britain =

Contactless smartcards are being progressively introduced to replace paper ticketing on the buses of Great Britain. The ITSO standard has been developed as a national standard to cover all types of public transport. It is also the format that ENCTS concessionary passes are required to be issued in. The contactless payment function of EMV credit and debit cards is also widely supported across the country.

As of 13 July 2020, the acceptance position is:

Region	Single smartcard valid across multiple operators		EMV credit / debit cards		Single operator period passes					Other operator smartcards for pay-as-you-go
Region	For period passes	For pay-as-you-go	For purchasing tickets	For pay-as-you-go	StagecoachSmart card	Go-Ahead (The Key) smartcard	First Touch smartcard	Arriva Connect smartcard	Other operator smartcards	Other operator smartcards for pay-as-you-go
England
Bedfordshire	Cygnet (Bedford)		Arriva Stagecoach Thameslink		Yes	Thameslink (The Key)		Yes	Centrebus (Carbonara & Pecorino)	Thameslink (keyGo)
Berkshire			First Berkshire Reading Buses Stagecoach	Carousel Buses TfL (touch in only) (Slough)	Yes				TfL Oyster (Slough) Courtney Connect	TfL Oyster (Slough) (touch in with capping) Courtney Connect
Bristol	travelwest	travelwest squidcard	First Bristol, Bath & the West		Yes					
Buckinghamshire			Arriva	Carousel Buses TfL (touch in only) (Denham)	Yes				TfL Oyster (Denham)	TfL Oyster (Denham) (touch in with capping)
Cambridgeshire			Stagecoach		Yes				Go-Whippet (Busway)	
Cheshire		Cheshire Travelcard	Arriva Stagecoach		Yes			Yes		
Cornwall			First Kernow Go Cornwall Stagecoach							
County Durham		Popcard	Stagecoach Arriva							
Cumbria		NowStar			Yes					
Derbyshire			Arriva Stagecoach		Yes					
Derby	Spectrum		Arriva							Trent Barton Mango (touch in and out with capping)
Devon	Skipper (Plymouth)		Plymouth Citybus Stagecoach		Yes	Yes (Plymouth Citybus)				
Dorset	Getting About		First Bus Morebus Yellow Bus			Yes (Morebus)			Yellow Bus Glo	Yellow Bus Glo Purse
East Riding of Yorkshire				Transdev Coastliner						
East Sussex			Stagecoach	Metrobus	Yes	Yes (Metrobus)				
Essex			Arriva TfL (Debden & Thurrock) Ensignbus	TfL (touch in only) (Debden & Thurrock)					TfL Oyster (Debden & Thurrock)	TfL Oyster (Debden & Thurrock) (touch in with capping)
Gloucestershire	travelwest				Yes		Touchcard			
Greater London	Oyster	Oyster (touch in)	Carousel Buses Citymapper Stagecoach (Oxford Tube)	TfL (touch in only)	Yes (Oxford Tube)	Yes (Metrobus)				
Greater Manchester	Get Me There		Arriva Stagecoach		Yes			Yes		
Hampshire	SolentGo		Stagecoach Bluestar First		Yes	Yes (Bluestar)	Touchcard			
Herefordshire					Yes					
Hertfordshire	Intalink SaverCard	Intalink (buy ticket on bus) SaverCard (PAYG)	Arriva	TfL (Potters Bar)	Yes				Centrebus (Carbonara & Pecorino)	
Isle of Wight			Southern Vectis			Yes (Southern Vectis)				
Kent		Kent and Medway Connected Smartcard	Arriva Stagecoach	TfL (Dartford & Bluewater)	Yes	Yes (Metrobus)			TfL Oyster (Dartford & Bluewater)	TfL Oyster (Dartford & Bluewater) (touch in with capping)
Lancashire		NowStar	Arriva Stagecoach Transdev Blackburn		Yes					
Leicestershire	Onecard (Leicester)		First Bus	Arriva Kinchbus	Yes				Kinchkard Centrebus (Carbonara & Pecorino)	Trent Barton Mango (touch in and out with capping)
Lincolnshire			Delaine Buses Stagecoach		Yes				Centrebus (Carbonara & Pecorino)	
Merseyside	MetroCard		Arriva Stagecoach All other operators		Yes			Yes		
Norfolk			Lynx Sanders Coaches		Yes					
North Yorkshire			Arriva Harrogate Bus Company							
Northamptonshire			Stagecoach		Yes				Centrebus (Pecorino)	
Northumberland		Popcard	Arriva Go North East			Yes (Go North East)				
Nottinghamshire	Robin Hood (Nottingham)	Robin Hood (Nottingham)	Stagecoach Trent Barton	Trent Barton	Yes				Nottingham City Transport Centrebus (Pecorino)	Trent Barton (Mango) (touch in and out with capping) Nottingham City Transport (e-purse)
Oxfordshire	Oxford SmartZone (Oxford)		Stagecoach	Oxford Bus Thames Travel	Yes	Yes (Oxford Bus Company, Thames Travel)				
Rutland									Centrebus (Pecorino)	
Shropshire			Arriva							
Somerset	travelwest		First Bus Stagecoach		Yes		Touchcard			
South Yorkshire	SYPTE Smartcard		Stagecoach		Yes also on Sheffield Supertram					
Staffordshire		Swift	Arriva First Bus	National Express West Midlands	Yes				National Express West Midlands Swift(Cannock and Stafford)	National Express West Midlands Swift(Cannock and Stafford) Trent Barton Mango (touch in and out with capping)
Suffolk	Endeavour (16-19 year olds only)		Ipswich Buses		Yes				Ipswich Buses	
Surrey			Safeguard (Guildford) Stagecoach Arriva	TfL (Sunbury, Dorking & Reigate); Metrobus	Yes	Yes (Metrobus)				
Tyne and Wear	Pop card	Pop card	Arriva Go North East Stagecoach		Yes	Yes (Go North East)		Yes		
Warwickshire			Stagecoach		Yes					
West Midlands	Swift	Swift Swift Go (account based)	Arriva Diamond Buses Midland Metro	National Express West Midlands	Yes					
West Sussex			Arriva Stagecoach	Metrobus Brighton Buses	Yes	Yes (Metrobus)				
West Yorkshire	MCard	MCard	Arriva First Bus	Transdev Harrogate Transdev Keighley	Yes					
Wiltshire			Salisburys Reds Thamesdown		Yes	Yes (Salisbury Reds)			Swindon (Thamesdown)	Swindon (Thamesdown)
Worcestershire	Swiftcard	Diamond Buses	Diamond Buses First Worcestershire		Yes					
York	York by bus		First York							
Wales
Blaenau Gwent					Yes					
Bridgend (Pen-y-bont ar Ogwr)					Yes					
Caerphilly (Caerffili)					Yes					
Cardiff (Caerdydd)			Cardiff Bus		Yes				Cardiff Bus iff card	Cardiff Bus iff card
Carmarthenshire (Sir Gaerfyrddin)										
Ceredigion										
Conwy				Arriva				Yes		
Denbighshire (Sir Ddinbych)				Arriva				Yes		
Flintshire (Sir y Fflint)				Arriva				Yes		
Gwynedd				Arriva				Yes		
Isle of Anglesey (Ynys Môn)				Arriva				Yes		
Merthyr Tydfil (Merthyr Tudful)					Yes					
Monmouthshire (Sir Fynwy)										
Neath Port Talbot (Castell-nedd Port Talbot)										
Newport (Casnewydd)					Yes				Newport Bus: Passport	Newport BUS: Freedom
Pembrokeshire (Sir Benfro)										
Powys										
Rhondda Cynon Taf					Yes					
Swansea (Abertawe)										
Torfaen (Tor-faen)					Yes					
Vale of Glamorgan (Bro Morgannwg)					Yes					
Wrexham (Wrecsam)			Arriva					Yes		
Scotland
Aberdeenshire	Grasshopper		First		Yes		Touchcard			
Angus					Yes					
Argyll and Bute										
City of Edinburgh			Lothian Buses (Airlink)	Lothian Buses					Lothian Buses: Ridacard Edinburgh Trams: Ridacard	Lothian Buses: CitySmart (journey based) Edinburgh Trams:CitySmart (journey based)
Clackmannanshire										
Dumfries and Galloway					Yes					
Dundee City	ABC									
East Ayrshire					Yes					
East Dunbartonshire										
East Lothian										
East Renfrewshire										
Falkirk					Yes					
Fife					Yes					
Glasgow City			First		Yes					
Highland										
Inverclyde									McGills (GoSmart)	
Midlothian					Yes					
Moray										
Na h-Eileanan Siar										
North Ayrshire					Yes					
North Lanarkshire										
Orkney Islands					Yes					
Perth and Kinross					Yes					
Renfrewshire			McGills						McGills (GoSmart)	
Scottish Borders										
Shetland Islands										
South Ayrshire					Yes					
South Lanarkshire										
Stirling					Yes					
West Dunbartonshire										
West Lothian										

== See also ==
- Smartcards on National Rail
