= London Connects =

Former British e-government initiative

London Connects was a project jointly owned by the Greater London Authority and London Councils.

The purpose of the organisation was to improving public services in London and reduce their cost through creating a coordinated approach to e-government.

Partners included a wide variety of bodies with responsibility for public services in London.

The project was formally launched in January 2005. The project was disbanded in 2009.
