= Kent Freedom Pass =

Bus travel scheme in Kent, England

- Location: Kent
- Technology: ITSO
- Manager: Kent County Council
- Validity: Bus companies throughout Kent
- Website: http://www.kent.gov.uk/kentfreedompass

The Kent Freedom Pass was a scheme introduced by Kent County Council in 2007 to offer discounted travel for young people in school years 7-11 (and 12-13 if a Young Carer or young person in care / care leavers) who live within the Kent County Council local authority area. The pass offered users unlimited bus travel within Kent (excluding Medway) for a cost of £100 per user (reduced to £50 for users who receive free school meals and no charge for Young Carers or those who are in care/care leavers).

The scheme was rebranded in 2019 and changed to The KCC Travel Saver. The rebranding was part of updates by Kent County Council to reflect changes in the scheme, including adjustments to pricing and eligibility criteria. The current pass offers significant discounts on bus travel for children and students within Kent, enabling cost savings of up to 50% for eligible users
