= ITSO =

ITSO may refer to:

- ITSO Ltd, previously Integrated Transport Smartcard Organisation, who maintain the ITSO standard for smart ticketing in the UK
- International Telecommunications Satellite Organization, an intergovernmental consortium
- Information Technology Student Organization, a student organization at Rochester Institute of Technology
- International Technical Support Organization, the IBM group that produces IBM Redbooks.
