= Brighton & Hove Coaster routes =

Series of Brighton & Hove bus routes

Coaster
- 11X, 12, 12A, 12X, 13X

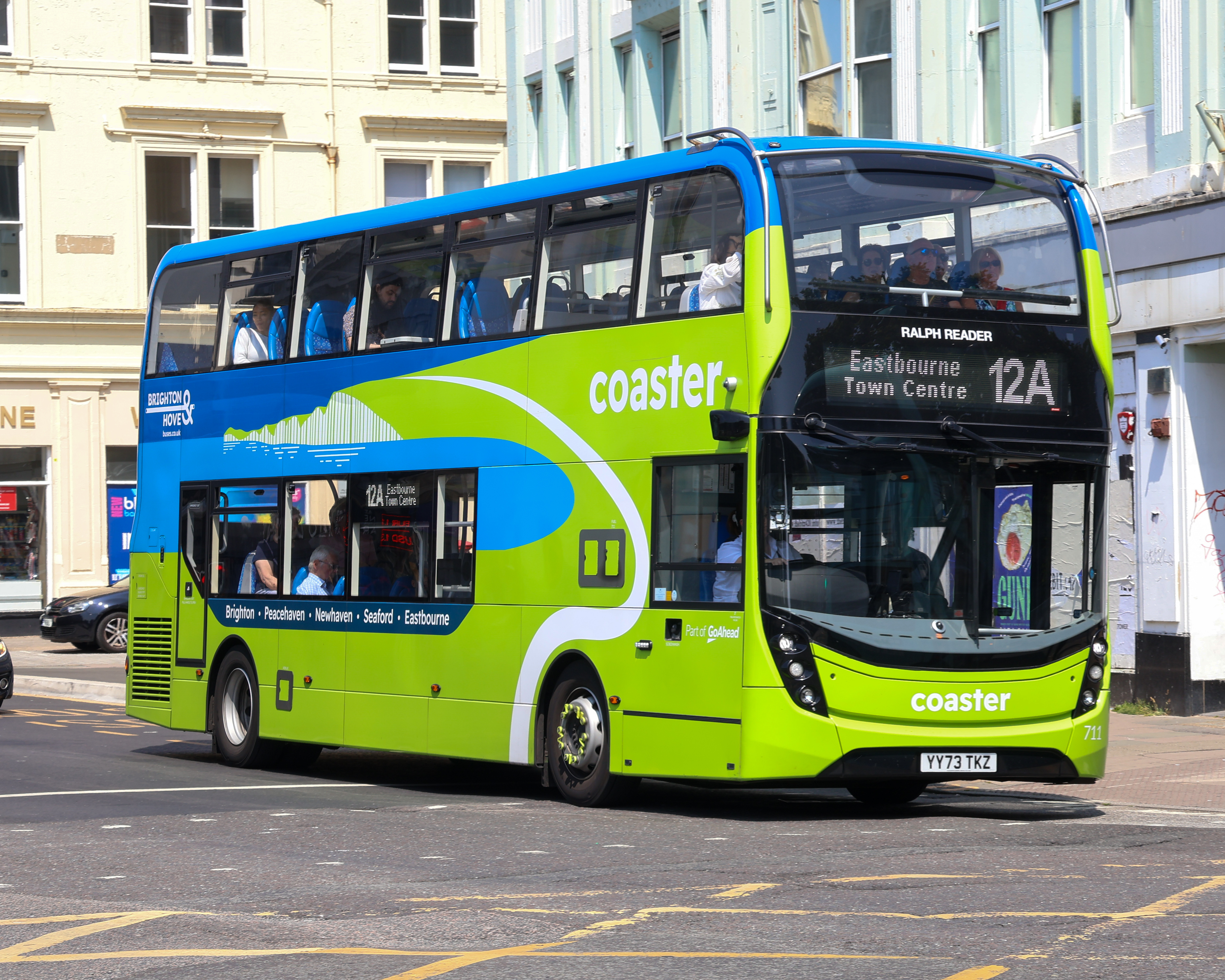
- A Coaster 12A Alexander Dennis Enviro400 MMC at Old Steine in June 2025

Overview
- Operator: Brighton & Hove
- Vehicle: Wright StreetDeck; Alexander Dennis Enviro400 MMC
- Began service: 1 January 1986
- Night-time: N12, N14

Route
- Start: Brighton station
- Via: Kemp Town; Rottingdean; Saltdean; Telscombe Cliffs; Peacehaven; Newhaven; Seaford; Seven Sisters Country Park; East Dean
- End: Eastbourne
- Stops: 108 (Route 12)

Service
- Level: 12/12A/12X/14/14A: Daily; 14B: Sundays only 14C: Mondays to Saturdays only 13X: Daily in summer, Sundays only in winter 11X: Summer Sundays only N12/N14: Tuesdays to Sundays morning only
- Frequency: Up to 14 buses per hour
- Journey time: 75–100 minutes depending on route
- Annual patronage: >5 million
- Timetable: Coaster 12 timetable

Coaster is the brand name given to a series of bus routes operated by the Brighton & Hove bus company, running between Brighton and Eastbourne in East Sussex, England.

The service has been praised for its scenic route, which takes riders along the Sussex coast atop the Brighton to Newhaven Cliffs, with Richard Coles declaring it "the best bus in the world" in 2022. The route has ranked high in various polls for the UK's most scenic bus routes, placing fourth in a 2023 list by Snaptrip ranking the country's top bus routes on value and scenery and ranked the second most popular route in the country for scenery following social media research by SunLife in 2022.

== Coaster 12 / 12A / 12X / N12 ==
Route 12, along with its variants 12A, 12X and N12, is the main service within the Coaster family. In 2018, these routes had a combined annual ridership of over 5 million. The routes connect the coastal settlements of Brighton, Rottingdean, Saltdean, Telscombe Cliffs, Peacehaven, Newhaven, Seaford, Friston, East Dean and Eastbourne. They also serve a number of tourist sites within the South Downs National Park, including the abandoned village of Tide Mills and the Seven Sisters cliffs.

Route 12 mostly follows the course of the A259 road along its entire journey, except briefly in Newhaven to serve the railway station interchange and the retail park. Route 12A deviates from the A259 to additionally serve the Denton neighbourhood in Newhaven and the Chyngton housing estate in Seaford. Route 12X follows the A259 throughout, and furthermore runs limited-stop between Brighton and Seaford town centre.

=== Frequencies ===
The daytime Monday–Saturday service pattern consists of a bus every 20 minutes each way on each of the three routes, with most route 12 services only running between Brighton and Seaford. This gives the combined service pattern of 9 buses per hour (Brighton–Seaford) or 6 per hour (Seaford–Eastbourne). During the weekday afternoon peak, the frequency on route 12X briefly increases in the eastbound direction to every 10 minutes.

On Sundays routes 12 and 12A run every 30 minutes each, giving a combined 4 buses per hour throughout. Route 12X does not operate on Sundays or on weekday evenings, and route 12 runs through to and from Eastbourne during these times.

== Coaster 13 / 13X ==
Route 13X runs mostly on public holidays or during the summer, and is a primarily tourist-oriented service. It also links Brighton with Eastbourne, and its course is mostly identical to that of route 12X (including its limited-stop nature between Brighton and Seaford), except near its eastern end where it additionally serves the popular cliffside destinations of Birling Gap and Beachy Head. In 2018, the route had an annual ridership of under 300,000.

The 13X runs most frequently on Sundays between April and October, with buses every 30 minutes each way. Less frequent services also operate on Sundays for the rest of the year, as well as on weekdays and Saturdays during the summer peak.

Route 13 operates one day per year, on Boxing Day. Like the 13X, it serves Birling Gap and Beachy Head, but it calls at all stops west of Seaford like route 12.

== Coaster 14 / 14A / 14B / 14C / N14 ==
Route 14, along with its variants 14A, 14B, 14C and N14, is another main service within the Coaster family. In 2018, these routes had a combined annual ridership of over 1 million. Similar to route 12, these routes connect the coastal settlements of Brighton, Rottingdean, Saltdean, Telscombe Cliffs, Peacehaven and Newhaven.

Route 14 and its variants mostly follow the course of the A259 road (with 14B and 14C running inland through Kemptown) along between Brighton and Peacehaven, with the distinguishing feature for the 14 series being a loop round the town of Peacehaven (with the exception of 14A), where routes 12 and 13 go straight through.. Most services only run between Brighton and Peacehaven, with only a limited services extending to Peacehaven.

=== Frequencies ===
On Monday to Saturday daytime, route 14 and 14C runs 4 services per hour, 3 of them being route 14 and the other being route 14C, reducing to every 35 minutes in the evening, with a few buses running as route 14A from Brighton straight into Peacehaven, then a one-way loop back through the town as route 14.

On Sunday daytime routes 14 and 14B run every hour each, giving a combined headway of every half an hour, while the evening service is about every 65 minutes.

== Coaster 11X ==
Route 11X operates only on summer Sundays, with three journeys per day in each direction between Brighton and Eastbourne. Unlike the 12s and the 13X, it runs further inland between Newhaven and Eastbourne: it follows the A26 and A27 roads, serving several local attractions such as Middle Farm, Charleston Farmhouse and Drusillas Zoo Park, as well as the town of Polegate. It runs limited-stop between Brighton and Newhaven and between Polegate and Eastbourne.

== Coaster Local 27 / 27B / 27C ==
Coaster Local
- 27, 27B, 27C

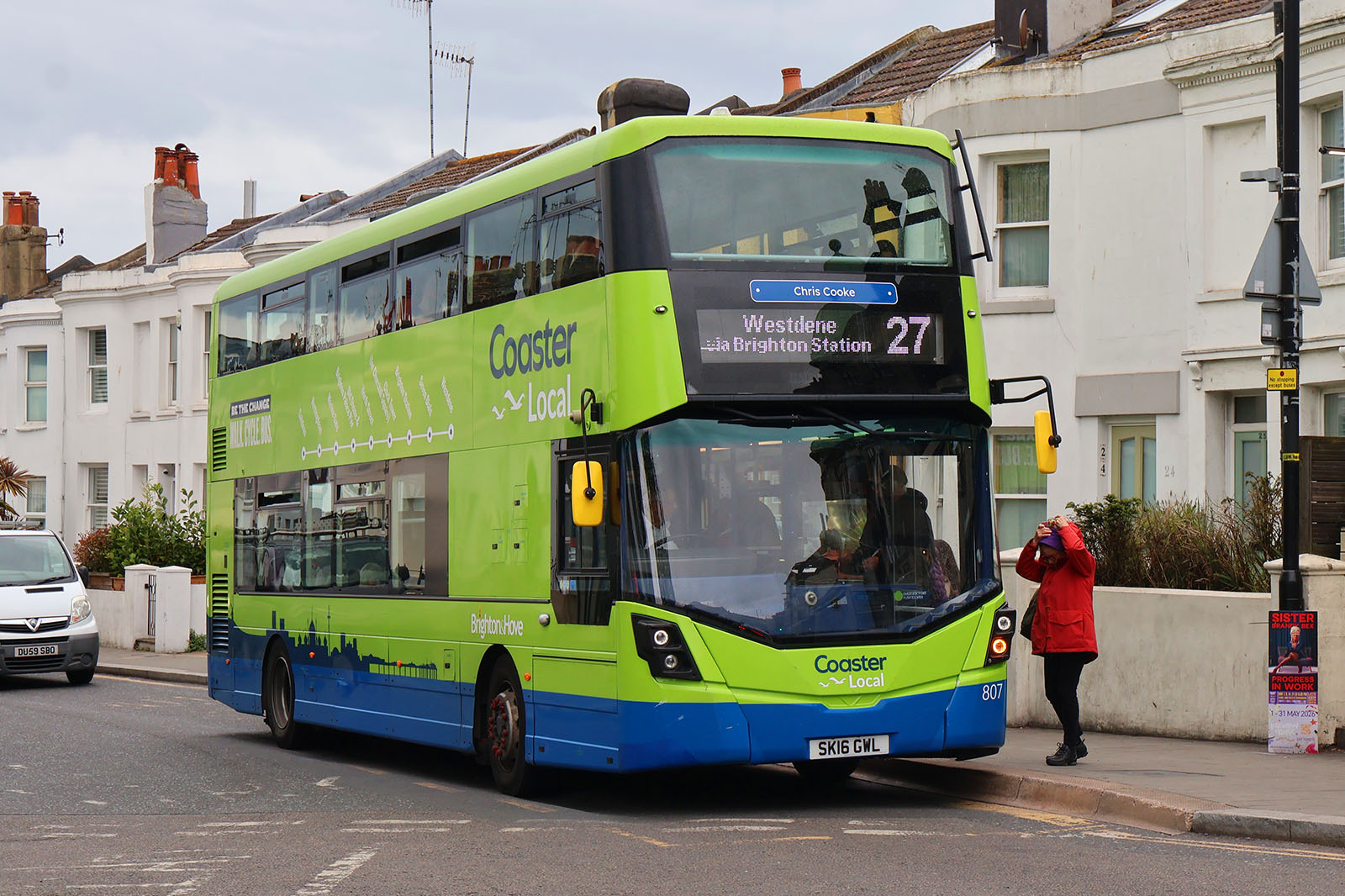
- A Wright StreetDeck in Coaster Local livery on route 27 at Surrey Street in May 2026

Overview
- Operator: Brighton & Hove
- Began service: 27 December 1992

Route
- Start: Westdene / Withdean
- Via: Prestonville; Seven Dials; Brighton station Kemp Town; Rottingdean
- End: Saltdean
- Stops: 49
- Other routes: 27B, 27C

Service
- Level: Daily
- Frequency: 15 minutes
- Journey time: 1 hour
- Annual patronage: >1.8 million
- Timetable: Coaster Local 27 timetable

Route 27, together with its variants 27B and 27C, is branded Coaster Local. It runs entirely within the boundary of Brighton and Hove, linking the suburbs of Westdene and Saltdean via Withdean (including Withdean Sports Complex), Prestonville, Seven Dials, the city centre, Kemp Town and Rottingdean. The route runs along the coast between the city centre and Saltdean, sharing this section with the Coaster services. In 2018, the route had an annual ridership of over 1.8 million.

Buses on this route run every 15 minutes on weekdays and Saturdays, and every 20 minutes on Sundays.
