= Swift card =

Payment method for public transport in the West Midlands

Swift
- Location: West Midlands (county)
- Technology: ITSO Smartcard
- Manager: Transport for West Midlands
- Currency: Pound sterling
- Stored-value: Pay-as-you-go
- Validity: West Midlands (county) buses; Rail zones 1-5; West Midlands Metro
- Retailed: Online; Travelshop; PayPoint
- Variants: Travelcards; TfWM-issued concessionary pass; e-Daysaver; West Midlands Metro staff passes
- Website: tfwm.org.uk/swift-and-tickets/

Swift is an electronic ticketing scheme developed by Transport for West Midlands for use on public transport in the West Midlands metropolitan area in England, similar to the Oyster card in Greater London. Rather than being a single card, it is a range of travel cards under a common name.

== History ==
Introduction began in 2012, with a phased rollout estimated to be completed by the end of 2015 when the system is rolled out across the local rail network, as part of rail devolution in the West Midlands county. Bus operators began to accept the scheme during this roll out; National Express West Midlands began accepting pay-as-you-go Swift cards in September 2015. In May 2018 at the Google I/O conference, it was announced that the Swift smartcard would be integrated with Google Pay to allow transport users to purchase a travel card online and have it immediately available on the users mobile device running the Android operating system. When the Metro came under the hands of TFWM, Swift Pay-as-you-go was added to all services, with passengers tapping once on the reader onboard the vehicle.
