= Freedom Pass =

UK concessionary travel scheme

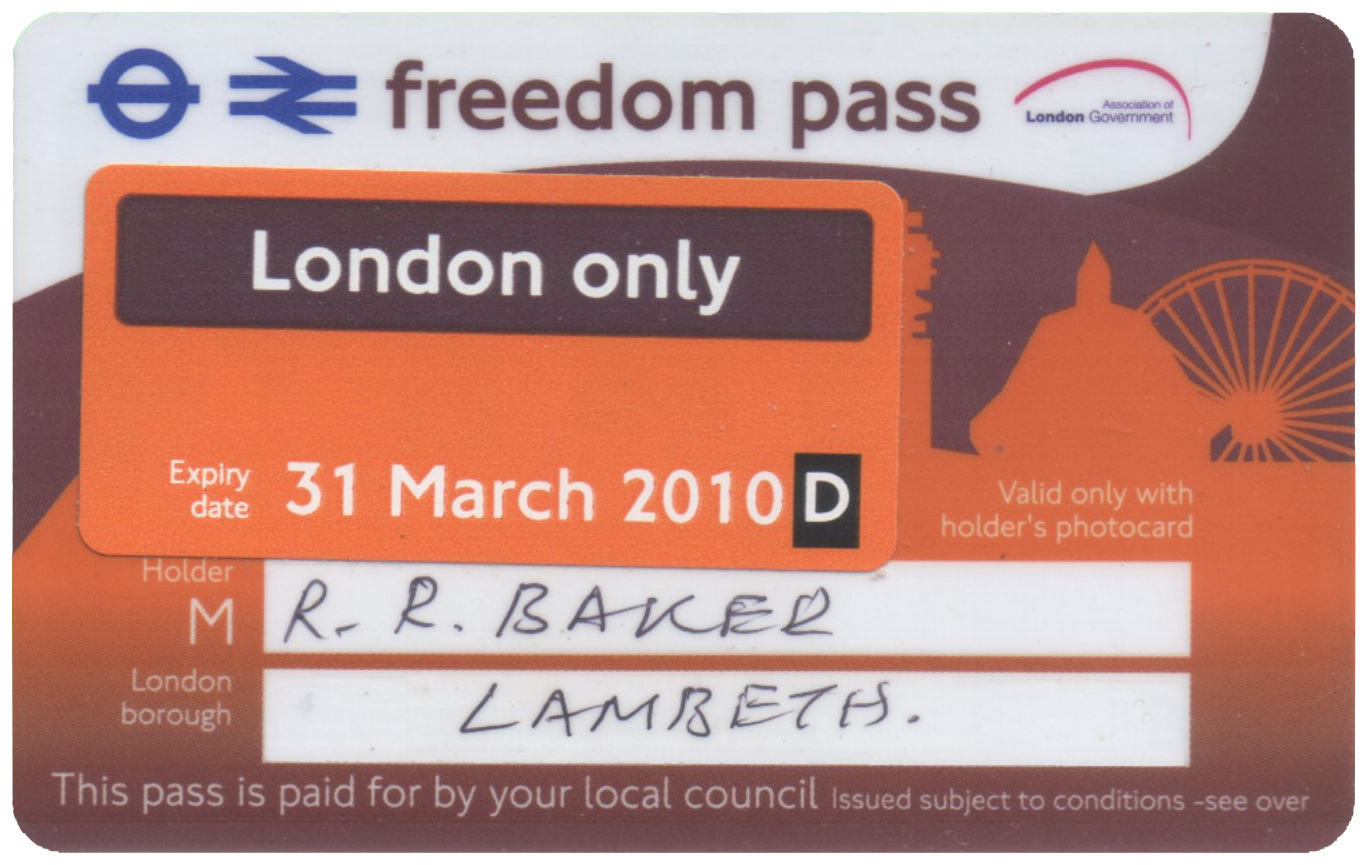
- Location: Greater London
- Technology: MIFARE / ITSO
- Manager: London Councils
- Validity: London Underground; London Buses; National Rail; DLR; Tramlink; Elizabeth line; Local buses in England
- Variants: Older people; Disabled
- Website: http://www.freedompass.org

Freedom Pass is a concessionary travel scheme, which began in 1973, to provide free travel to residents of Greater London, England, for people with a disability or over the progressively increasing state pension age (66 in 2026). The scheme is funded by local authorities and coordinated by London Councils.

The pass was originally a paper ticket, but became an Oyster card-compatible contactless smartcard.

== History ==
The scheme was created in 1973 by the Greater London Council, although there had been concessionary bus fare schemes in London before that. When the council was abolished in 1986, responsibility for the scheme passed to the London borough councils. The cost of providing the travel concession is negotiated between London Councils and the local transport operator Transport for London (TfL). It is funded through a mixture of national grant and council tax. In 2007 there was a dispute between Mayor of London Ken Livingstone and London Councils on the negotiation process, in particular the ability for the Greater London Authority to impose a charge should no agreement be reached.

Originally the pass was a paper ticket, but since 2004 it has been encoded on to a contactless smartcard compatible with Oyster card readers, and since 2010 also ITSO card readers.

In 2026 London Councils (a cross-party organisation representing London's 32 borough councils and the City of London) considered withdrawing or restricting eligibility for or applicability of the Freedom Pass to save money; the cost had been projected to rise from 333m in 2025–26 to around £372m in 2026–27. Following a campaign by Age UK London and a petition signed by tens of thousands the proposal was shelved.

== Eligibility ==
There are two type of Freedom Passes: an Older Person's Freedom Pass (OPFP) and a Disabled Person's Freedom Pass (DPFP); the former has a blue right hand edge band and the latter a yellow one to enable transport operators to quickly identify which concessions are applicable. They originally provided identical facilities, but the OPFP later had restriction on some use at busy times.

Greater London residents become eligible for a Freedom Pass on reaching state pension age (66 in 2026, progressively increasing). London residents over 60 but below pension age are eligible for a 60+ Oyster card on payment of £36, with all the benefits of the Freedom Pass within Greater London, but not valid on buses outside Greater London.

London residents with specified disabilities are entitled by the Transport Act 2000 to a DPFP:

1. People who are blind or partially sighted
2. People who are profoundly or severely deaf
3. People without speech
4. People who have a disability, or have had an injury, which has left them with a substantial and long-term adverse effect on their ability to walk
5. People who do not have arms or have a long-term loss of the use of both arms
6. People who have a learning disability that is defined as 'a state of arrested or incomplete development of mind which includes significant impairment of intelligence and social functioning'
7. People who, if they applied for the grant of a licence to drive a motor vehicle under Part III of the Road Traffic Act 1988, would have their application refused pursuant to section 92 of the Act (physical fitness) otherwise than on the ground of persistent misuse of drugs or alcohol.

Some boroughs additionally issue discretionary Freedom Passes to disabled people who do not meet the statutory eligibility criteria. Applicants who do not automatically qualify (e.g. by being already certified as blind) are assessed to determine whether their degree of disability allows issue of a disabled person's pass. In early 2010 the responsibility for judging the degree of disability passed to local councils, and there were complaints of people who had been assessed as needing a pass for many years not having their passes renewed although their condition had not improved. DPFPs are not available for carers.

== Scope and validity ==
The Freedom Pass is valid at most times on London Underground, London Overground, Elizabeth line, London Buses, Tram, and Docklands Light Railway services, including stops within and outside Greater London. The times of day at which it can be used have sometimes changed; since 2020 the OPFP and 60+ pass (the disabled person's pass is not so restricted) cannot be used from 4:30 to 9:00 on working weekdays.

It is accepted at most times on most local rail services in and outside Greater London except from 4:30 to 9:30 on working weekdays that are within London fare zones 1–6, plus Dartford and Swanley.

Outside Greater London the card can be used for free travel on any local bus route in England (but not Scotland, Wales or Northern Ireland) wherever and whenever the English National Concessionary Bus Travel Scheme applies. Travel on working days before 9:30 and after 23:00 is excluded, although some operators may extend hours of validity.

Since 2015 OPFPs have been valid for five years, and are renewed automatically when expired. DPFPs may require confirmation of continuing eligibility.

=== Exceptions ===
Up-to-date information, which changes from time to time, is available on the TfL and the Association of London Councils websites.

The Freedom Pass is not valid for travel on many longer-distance train services even if they stop within Greater London (many such journeys are prohibited for all passengers by "stops for picking up/setting down only" restrictions) or for non-TfL trains to Heathrow airport. Routes and times of validity of Freedom Passes on the rail network are published and updated as necessary. Freedom Pass validity for these services is less than that of Oyster cards. For travel through and beyond the Freedom Pass area, separate extension tickets starting at the Freedom Pass boundary may be bought.

For travel which crosses the boundary of the area of validity of the Freedom Pass at a time and on a service where the Pass is valid, it is normally necessary to buy a ticket only for the section not covered by the Pass, i.e. a ticket from the Freedom Pass boundary, or from a named station within the zone of validity. In the latter case where multiple operators exist but only one calls at the boundary station, it can sometimes be cheaper to buy a ticket for the cheaper operator from the last station at which their trains call before the boundary rather than the boundary station (e.g. "Thameslink only" from East Croydon rather than "Any Operator" from Coulsdon South).

The Freedom Pass is not valid on most intercity coach services; other restrictions apply on bus or coach services which are not operating as a stage carriage (in summary, a service of any distance using buses or coaches providing local services) or in substitution of a railway service on which the Freedom Pass would be valid. It is not valid outside England.

== Replacement ==
A lost, stolen, damaged, or faulty pass can be replaced on application. There is a charge of £14.35 (2025) for loss or damage, not applicable if the pass is stolen and a police crime reference number has been obtained, and refundable if the pass is returned and found on examination to be faulty rather than damaged.

A faulty or damaged Freedom Pass that does not function as a contactless Oyster card remains valid for travel until replaced; it must be presented for manual inspection. The Freedom Pass website warns that the transport operator's staff will inspect the pass closely to confirm validity, and suggests carrying additional proof of identity; a pass whose validity is doubted may not be accepted.

== Restoration of free travel at age 60 ==
Since November 2012 Greater London residents aged 60 or over who do not qualify for a Freedom Pass are eligible for a 60+ Oyster card on payment of a £36 administration fee; this restores the entitlement to free (at the time of use) travel from the age of 60 that was removed when the general qualifying age for concessionary travel was tied by national legislation to the state pension age in 2010. The 60+ Oyster card is valid on the same services within Greater London and some adjacent places, with the exception of West Drayton - Reading on Elizabeth line, as the Freedom Pass but is not valid for travel elsewhere in England.

In 2022, Prime Minister Boris Johnson falsely claimed to have introduced the Freedom Pass during an interview where he was questioned about a pensioner having to ride the bus all day to save on heating costs during the 2021–2023 global energy crisis. As Mayor of London, he was responsible for the 2012 changes, but the pass itself predates his term by several decades. It was also pointed out that one of the conditions of his government's TfL bailout during the COVID-19 pandemic involved new restrictions imposed on the use of the Freedom Pass.

== See also ==
- English National Concessionary Travel Scheme
