= Brighton & Hove (bus company) =

English bus operator

- Wright StreetDeck Electroliner battery electric bus in Hove in May 2026
- Parent: Go-Ahead Group
- Founded: 1884; 142 years ago
- Headquarters: Hove, East Sussex, England
- Service area: West Sussex; East Sussex; Kent
- Service type: Bus services
- Destinations: Brighton and Hove; Eastbourne; Lewes; Shoreham-by-Sea; Steyning; Tunbridge Wells
- Fleet: 310 (December 2025)
- Website: www.buses.co.uk

Brighton & Hove Bus and Coach Company Limited, trading as Brighton & Hove, is a bus company operating most bus services in the city of Brighton and Hove in southern England. It is a subsidiary of the Go-Ahead Group. The city is ranked second in terms of bus passenger journeys per head in the country at 154 in the year ending March 2025, more than four times the national average of 37.

== History ==
Brighton & Hove was established in 1884 as Brighton, Hove and Preston United Omnibus Company. In 1916, Thomas Tilling took over the company and replaced all its remaining horse buses with motor buses. In November 1935 it was formed as the Brighton Hove and District Omnibus Company. In January 1969 it merged with Southdown Motor Services as a subsidiary of the National Bus Company. In January 1985 in preparation for privatisation, Brighton & Hove was separated from Southdown. In May 1987 it was sold in a management buyout. In November 1993, Brighton & Hove was sold to the Go-Ahead Group.

In 1997, the Go-Ahead Group purchased Brighton Transport (1993) Ltd. for £5.76 million. Brighton Transport was the former municipally owned bus operator in the city which latterly traded as Brighton Blue Bus following a management buyout in 1993. Go-Ahead merged the Brighton Blue Bus operations with those of Brighton & Hove following the completion of the purchase.

Brighton & Hove's operations expanded further in September 2007 with the acquisition of Stagecoach South's Lewes operations, which operated routes from Brighton to Eastbourne, Tunbridge Wells and Lewes itself. 15 out of 26 vehicles based at Lewes' depot were included in the sale, as were its 70 staff, however the depot building was not included in the acquisition and was subsequently closed.

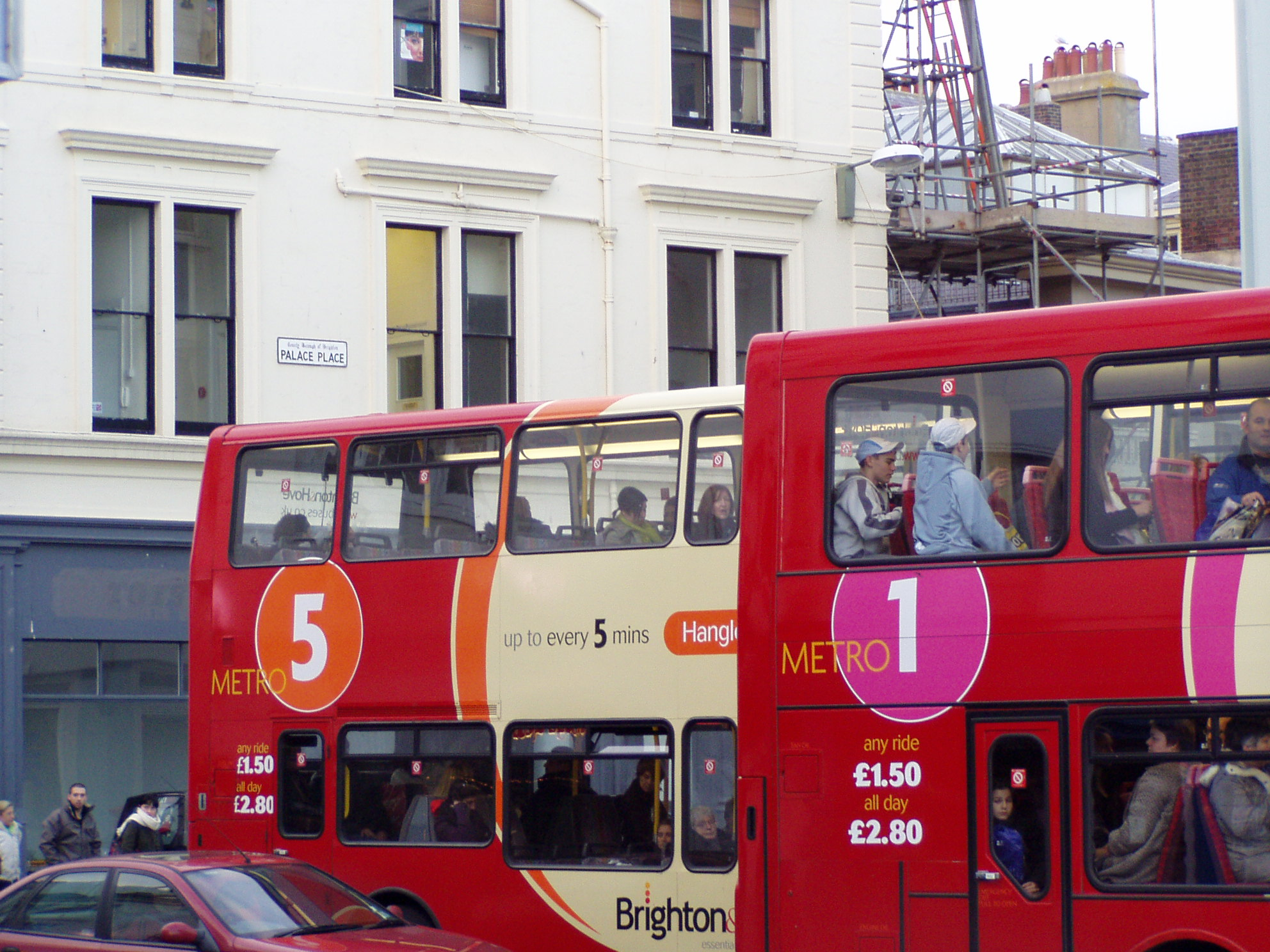
The Metro branding in December 2005

Between 1996 and 1997, five of Brighton & Hove's most popular routes (1/1A, 5/5A/5B, 7, 25 and 49) were enhanced with new buses and individual route branding. All five routes offer regular services, modern buses and a wide range of connections throughout the centre of Brighton and Hove, reinforced by a colour-coded diagrammatic map. Since 2004, Brighton & Hove have gradually introduced new buses to the Metro routes, the majority being Scania OmniDekkas. In April 2011, Metro 7 was removed from the Metro network and rebranded as Route 7 with brand new Wright Eclipse Gemini 2 bodied Volvo B9TLs operating on the route. The last Metro branded buses in service were the Scania OmniCity double deckers delivered in 2009, mostly operating on Metro 5. The final few examples of Metro branding were removed in October 2013.

== Operations and routes ==
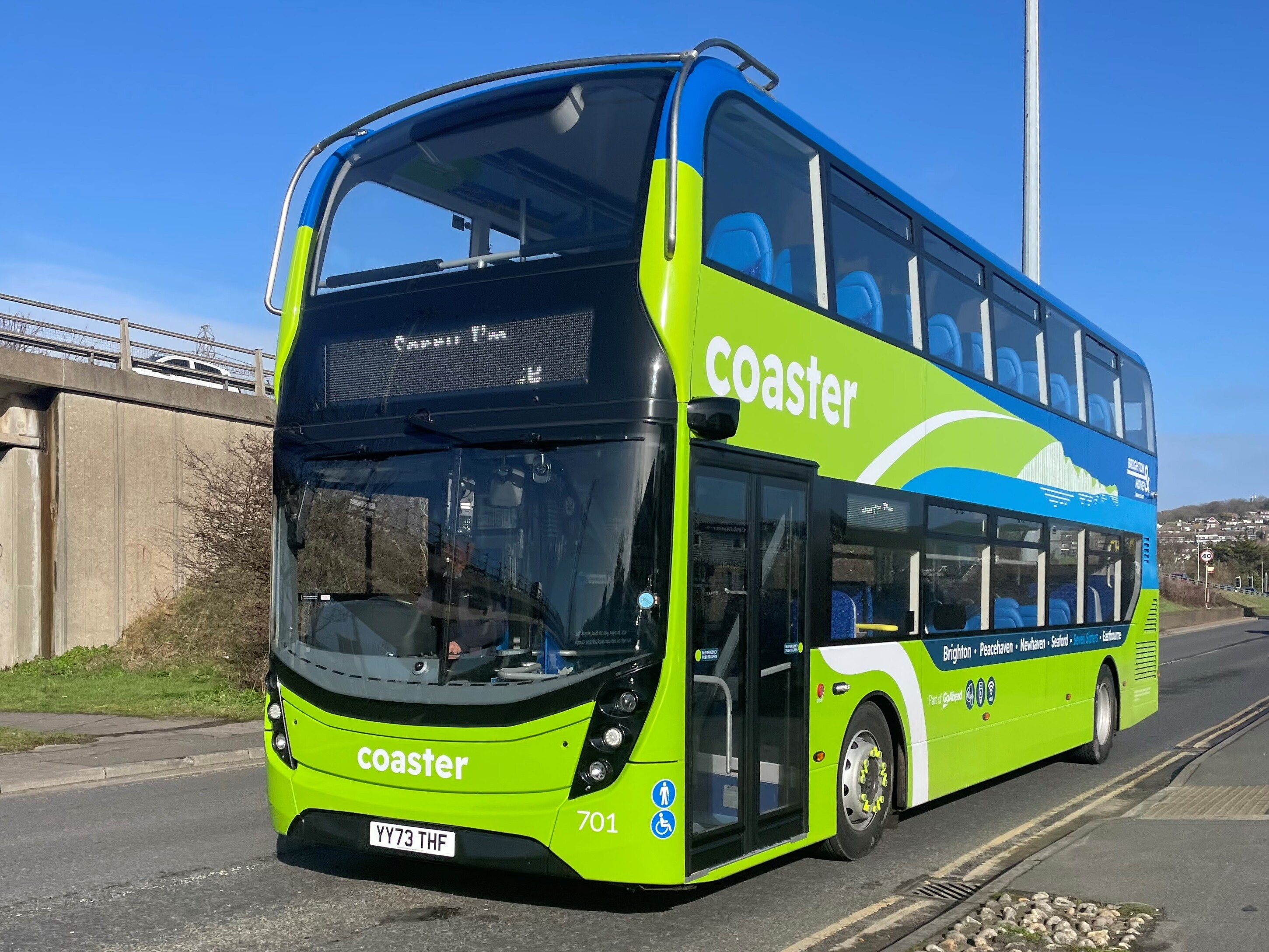
Diesel-powered Alexander Dennis Enviro400 MMC branded for Coaster 12 in February 2024

The company's routes cover a large area encompassing the whole of the city, some parts of West and East Sussex and a single route into Kent. There are 40 separately numbered standard routes. Frequencies range from every 5 minutes to two journeys per day. In addition, there are nine night bus routes and 19 school bus routes. In September 2005, the company took over many routes previously operated partly or entirely by Stagecoach South, the best example being the Coaster services 12 and 13X to Seaford and Eastbourne.

The company operates from three depots: Conway Street, Whitehawk and Lewes Road. Conway Street also serves as the company's headquarters. The company also has four outstations in Newhaven, Eastbourne, Uckfield and Durrington.

=== The Regency Route ===
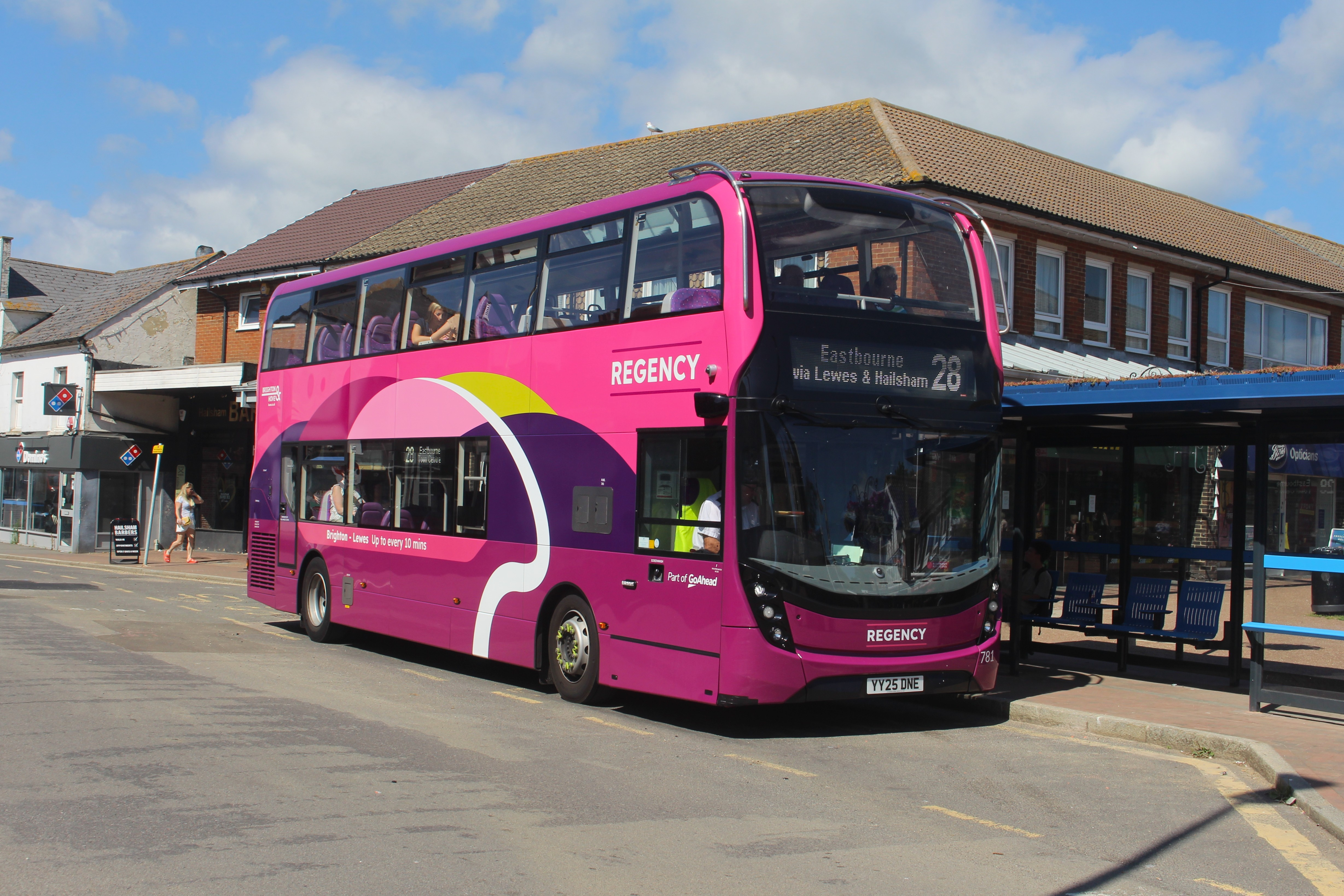
Regency Route branded Alexander Dennis Enviro400 MMC on route 28

The Regency Route is one of Brighton & Hove's branded routes. It began as route 729 by the nationalised Southdown Motor Services subsidiary of the National Bus Company, of which Brighton & Hove was a part, and the route was part of the NBC's cross-country "Stagecoach" network.

The Regency Route currently consists of the following services:

- Route 28 operates between Brighton and Eastbourne via Falmer, Lewes, Ringmer, Hailsham and Polegate. Buses operate every 30 minutes on weekdays and Saturdays (with an extra bus each hour between Brighton and Lewes) and hourly on Sundays between Brighton and Hailsham only.
- Routes 29/29B/29X operate between Brighton and Tunbridge Wells via Falmer, Lewes, Uckfield, Crowborough and Eridge (with buses on route 29B additionally serving Ringmer and Halland). Route 29 operates every 30 minutes on weekdays and Saturdays and hourly on Sundays. Route 29B operates a single return journey on weekdays only and route 29X operates a single early morning southbound journey on weekdays only.
- Route 29A operates between Brighton and Heathfield via Falmer, Lewes, Isfield, Uckfield and Blackboys. Buses operate hourly on all days of the week.

These services combine to give an off-peak service of a bus every 10 minutes in each direction between Brighton and Lewes on weekdays and Saturdays, and a bus every 20 minutes in each direction on Sundays.

=== The Breeze routes ===
Three "Breeze" branded routes, with the slogan "breeze up to the Downs and beyond", currently run to beauty spots of the Sussex Downs on weekends and bank holidays:

- Route Breeze 77, which runs between Brighton Pier and Devil's Dyke, with 12 journeys operating each way every 45 minutes. Buses also run daily between 18 June and 31 August and two extra journeys each way are added in the evenings from 17 June to 1 September.
- Route Breeze 78, which runs between Old Steine and Stanmer Village, with 8 hourly journeys operating each way.
- Route Breeze 79, which runs between Old Steine and Ditchling Beacon, with 8 hourly journeys operating each way.

In 2018, the routes had an annual ridership of under 300,000 separately. In February 2024, Brighton and Hove City Council proposed withdrawing its subsidies for routes 77 and 79. The following month, it said it had secured funding for an additional year but that the routes would have to operate on a commercial basis after that.

=== Express routes ===
There are currently three express routes on the network, operating at high frequencies and limited stops. From June 2026, these routes only accept non-cash payments to reduce dwell times.

==== Route 1X ====
In July 2024, the company launched a new limited stop bus service, 1X, which replaced route 1A. It operates between Mile Oak and Brighton Marina with an end-to-end journey time of approximately 45 minutes. Six new Enviro400MMCs (739-744) were ordered to operate on the route.

==== Route 3X ====
In September 2025, a second limited stop route was launched. Route 3X is a frequent cross-city service connecting Hangleton and Falmer, via Hove and Brighton Stations. It is operated by a purpose-built fleet of Enviro400MMCs. The route is funded through the Bus Service Improvement Plan (BSIP) granted via the central government.

==== Route 25X ====
The limited stop service, 25X, was reinstated after previously ceasing operation in 2022. Route 25X is an express service operating between Old Steine and Sussex University at Falmer, via Lewes Road and University of Brighton. The service runs every 30 minutes, Monday to Friday during term time only.

=== Spirit of Sussex ===
In 2016, the company's coaching division was rebranded to Spirit of Sussex. It provides private hire and contract routes across the South East. The coaching fleet is split between depots, with the majority of vehicles stationed at their Ringmer depot which was acquired from Eastbourne Sightseeing when Brighton & Hove purchased the operation.

On 29 August 2024, Brighton & Hove announced they had purchased Lewes-based Regency Coaches, with the brand being absorbed into Spirit of Sussex, including 16 vehicles and 14 staff.

== Competition ==
Brighton & Hove face limited competition on some of its network of routes. The Big Lemon bus operator, a community interest company founded in 2007 who used to run a route between the University of Sussex and central Brighton, is the largest competitor. It was set up in an effort to make Brighton and Hove's public transport options more sustainable by using biodiesel collected by the company from businesses around the city as well as offering private hire services.

The Big Lemon originally operated an express service numbered 42X which ran from Brighton station to Falmer station using elderly step entranced buses. However the service was dropped in December 2007. A relaunch of the service commenced in early 2008 numbered 42. In 2010 the company started two more services, 43 and 44. However just months after it began route 43 ended due to low passenger numbers. In 2011 The Big Lemon faced competition from Brighton & Hove Buses in that Brighton Buses lowered its fares to match fares charged by The Big Lemon. In January 2012 The Big Lemon stopped running route 42 and continued to run route 44 only, split into two shuttles numbered UB1 and UB2. The Big Lemon subsequently ceased operation of these services, and shuttle UB1 was operated by the University of Brighton until June 2023. The company operated tendered routes 16, 47 and 52 until the 30th March 2025.

Other companies which run into the city include Brighton & Hove subsidiary Metrobus, which operates routes 270 (to/from East Grinstead), 271, 272 and 273 (all to/from Crawley, with the former two also serving RSC Hospital). Stagecoach South run route 17 Horsham to Churchill Square, and route 700 Old Steine to Portsmouth.

Compass Travel operate a network of routes under the 'CityBuzz' brand. These are routes 16 from Portslade to Hangleton, 37/37B from Bristol Estate to Meadowview, 47 from Hangleton to East Saltdean and 52 from Patcham to Woodingdean.

== Subsidies ==
Under the Transport Act 1985 Brighton and Hove City Council has the authority to put out to tender contracts (>5 years) to fill gaps in bus availability that arise due to lack of profitability. For example, the 81, 81A and 81C buses are subsidised, depending on route, from .03p (based on operations Monday – Saturday services) up to £1.32 (based on Winter Sunday evening services) for each fare bought. The council is also obliged to subsidise school bus routes. For example, the 91 Cardinal Newman School bus is currently subsidised at £4.10 per single journey.

Brighton & Hove Bus and Coach Company operates the majority of the contracts.

Payments to Brighton & Hove Buses from the Brighton & Hove City Council public transport budget
Year	Subsidy
2011–12	£1,177,600
2010–11	£1,140,200
2009–10	£1,236,800
2008–09	£1,340,000
2007–08	£1,143,600

== Fares and ticketing ==
The company operates, to a large extent, a flat fare system – people can travel on almost all of its buses, and to almost everywhere on its network, for fixed prices. The CitySAVER ticket allows people to travel as often as they want for one day anywhere on any combination of buses, with a few exceptions. There are also longer-period season tickets, there are tickets valid also with local rail services and other bus operators, and various concessions for students, people under 16, passengers boarding at Brighton Station and several others.

In late 2011, the company began supporting Go-Ahead's The Key smartcard a bid to curb ticket sharing and speed up boarding times. It can also be used to store train tickets.

Brighton & Hove buses also support The Key's keyGo system for pay-as-you-go travel within the PlusBus zones in Brighton, Eastbourne and Lewes. Journeys are charged per touch in, and are capped daily. If a train journey has been made on the same day with keyGo, the system will cap bus transport to the relevant PlusBus cap.

Contactless payments were first made available in November 2018 as a method for payment, and in September 2019, the company piloted the first tap-on, tap-off contactless scheme in the UK alongside its sister company, Metrobus, with aims to improve boarding times and make travelling convenient.

== Named buses ==
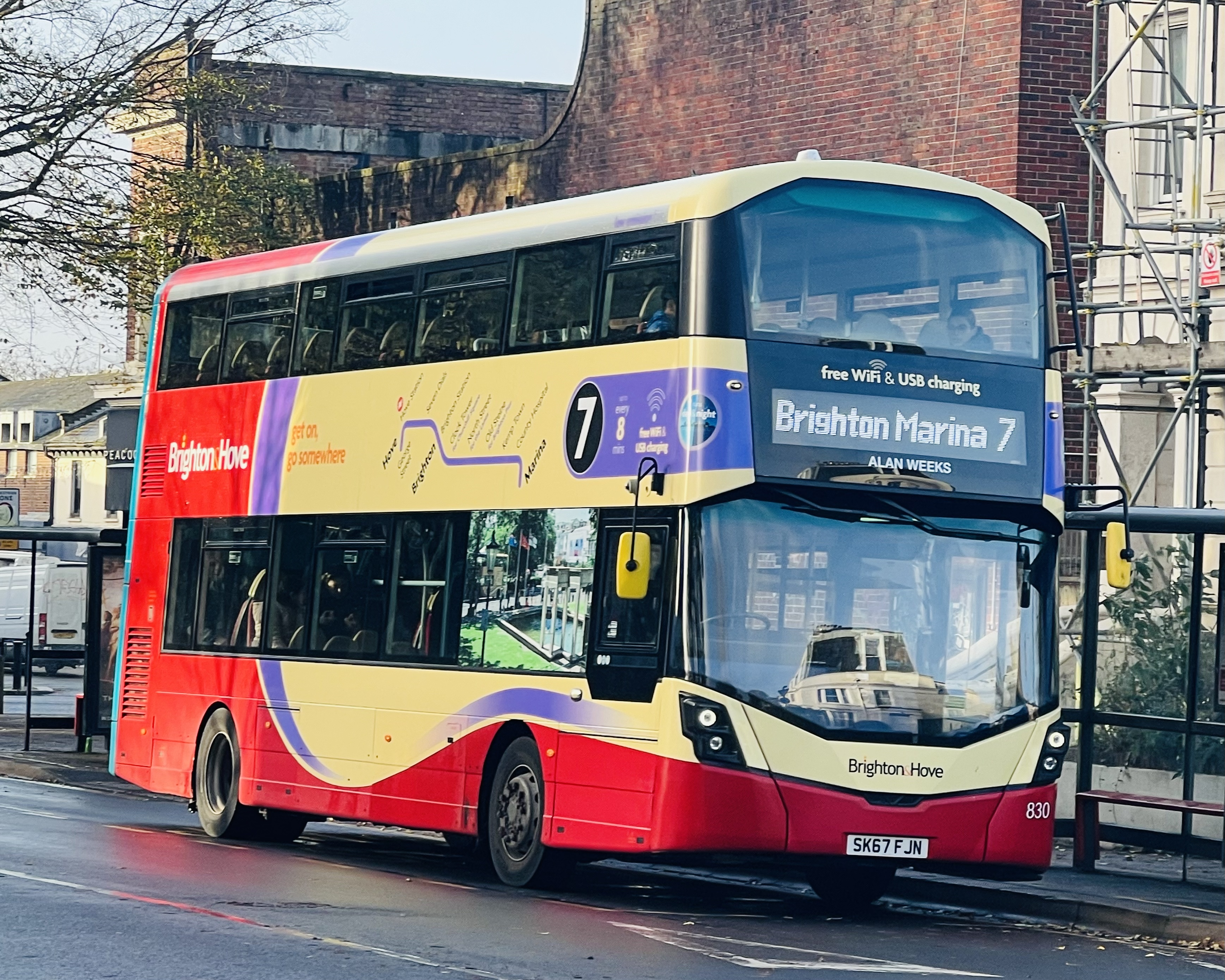
Wright StreetDeck seen carrying the name Alan Weeks, after the BBC commentator who lived in the city until his death in 1996

As of 2024, the company's entire operational fleet each wear the name of a person notable to the city, famous or not, commemorated on the front.

In 1999 the company ran a competition asking local residents to name the 20 new double-decker buses that had just been added to its fleet. The company had started with names such as Brighton Belle, Brighton Rock, Brighton Pier, Brighton & Hove Albion, Hove Actually and Brighton and Hove in Bloom, and then asked local residents for help. It considered the options of naming the buses after landmarks in the town, people from the past, and present day celebrities with local connections.

In April 2004 the company added another 18 buses to its fleet, and continued the practice of naming them. The company's stated rule for choosing the name was: "The nominations must have made a significant contribution to the life of the local area during their lifetime and must have since died." However several living people are in fact featured on the bus fronts.

In September 2005 the company added a further 19 buses to its fleet, naming them after people who had "made great contributions to the city" – and including more female names, after complaints that the system had been too male-dominated up to that point. For a year one of the buses had been named after local historian and journalist Adam Trimingham.

Amid protests and petitions against memorials during the George Floyd protests in the United Kingdom, in July 2020, Brighton & Hove temporarily removed the name Sir Winston Churchill, first carried in the fleet since 2000, from one of their buses in the Spirit of Sussex fleet. This bus was later given the name Betty Howard, chairperson of the Women's Guild Friendship and a prominent private hirer of Brighton & Hove coaches, in November 2020.

== Fleet ==
As of 2024 the Brighton & Hove fleet consists of roughly 300 buses. The company mainly uses Alexander Dennis Enviro400MMCs, Wright Eclipse Gemini 2 bodied Volvo B9TLs, Wright StreetDeck and Scania Omnidekkas. In October 2019 the company received 30 Alexander Dennis Enviro400ER hybrid electric buses for use on Route 5/5A/5B, which are geofenced to be used in electric mode within Brighton and Hove's ULEZ (Ultra Low Emission Zone). An additional 24 buses were delivered in 2020 for use on Route 1/1A(Now 1X).

In April 2022, the bus company announced that by the end of 2022, all articulated buses ("bendy buses") in its fleet would be withdrawn. The Mercedes-Benz Citaro buses, acquired from Go-Ahead London started on Route 25 in April 2010 and were used on the 25, 25X and N25 routes from Old Steine or Portslade to the University of Brighton and the University of Sussex. The company stated the withdrawal of these buses was due to low passenger usage after the COVID-19 pandemic, high fuel usage, and a lack of spare parts for the buses. The final articulated bus was withdrawn after operating a special service on 7 November, with the buses replaced with refurbished Wright Eclipse Gemini 2 bodied Volvo B9TLs transferred from Go-Ahead London (201-216 which are ex-WVL 451-453, 477-480, 468, 470-476, 469).

In June 2023, the company announced it would be replacing its red and cream livery with a teal and aqua livery.

In early 2024, deliveries commenced for a new fleet of 44 Alexander Dennis Enviro400 MMC buses, to operate the Coaster routes, as well as Route 1X.

== Depots ==
Brighton & Hove's Lewes Road depot in July 2026

- Brighton (Lewes Road)
- Brighton (Whitehawk Road)
- Hove (Conway Street)
- Newhaven (Beach Close)
- Uckfield (outstation)
- Eastbourne (outstation)

== Incidents ==
All of the listed incidents have involved at least one Brighton & Hove bus.

- On 6 July 2015, a double-decker bus crashed into the back of another on North Street, near the Clock Tower. 19 people were treated at nearby hospitals, 13 at the Royal Sussex County Hospital and six at the Princess Royal Hospital in Haywards Heath, 20 miles away.
- On 24 February 2018 at about 12:50 a.m., a 15-year-old boy walking down Marine Parade was hit by a bus and died shortly after being taken to hospital.
- On 16 August 2019, a 76-year-old man walking at the corner of Edward Street and Upper Rock Gardens was seriously injured in a collision. He died in hospital just over a week later on 24 August.
- On 20 April 2021 between 3 and 4 a.m., an out of service double-decker bus crashed into a bridge on Kingston Lane in Southwick. The crash ripped off the roof of the bus, and the driver continued driving despite the crash. He was charged with dangerous driving and failing to stop after an accident.

== See also ==
- List of bus operators of the United Kingdom
- Trolleybuses in Brighton
- Go-Ahead Group
