= London Councils =

Collective of local government in Greater London, England

- Logo
- Predecessor: Association of London Authorities; London Boroughs Association; From 1 April 2000: London Boroughs Grants Committee; Greater London Employers Association; London Housing Unit; Transport Committee for London
- Formation: 1995
- Purpose: Cross-party organisation representing 32 London borough councils and the City of London. Develop policy and provide London-wide services.
- Headquarters: 4th Floor, 12 Arthur Street
- Location: City of London
- Region served: London
- Chair: Claire Holland, Labour Party
- Website: www.londoncouncils.gov.uk
- Formerly called: Association of London Government (ALG)

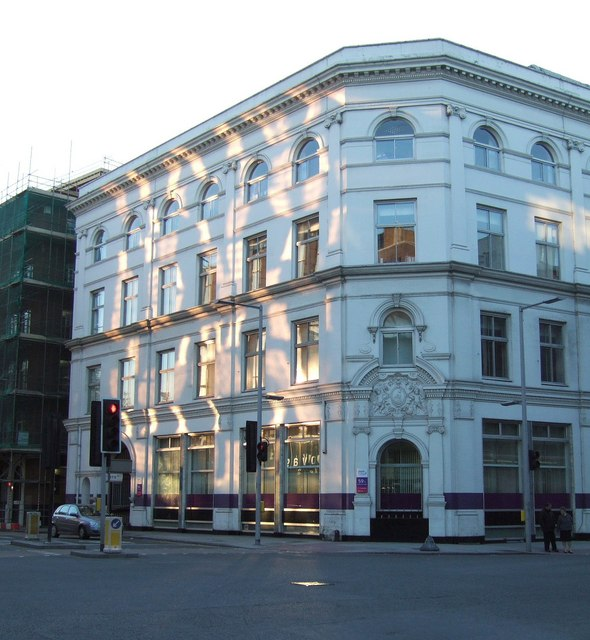
London Councils former main offices at 59½ Southwark Street, London Borough of Southwark.

London Councils is the collective of local government in Greater London, England. It is a cross-party organisation that represents London's 32 borough councils and the City of London. It was formed in 1995 as a merger of the London Boroughs Association and the Association of London Authorities. In April 2000 it gained further functions as strategic local government in London was reorganised. London Councils is a think tank and lobbying organisation, and also provides some services directly through legislation that allows multiple local authorities to pool responsibility and funding, such as Freedom Pass. London Councils was based at 59½ Southwark Street before moving to 12 Arthur Street in the City of London in 2024.

== History ==
The Association of London Government (ALG) came out of a merger between the London Boroughs Association and the Association of London Authorities in 1995. The ALA consisted of many, mainly Labour, councils which had left the LBA in the 1980s.

To coincide with the creation of the Greater London Authority, the ALG merged with the London Boroughs Grants Committee, the Greater London Employers Association, the London Housing Unit and the Transport Committee for London on 1 April 2000.

In October 2006, the organisation changed its name from the Association of London Government to London Councils to avoid confusion with the Greater London Authority (GLA) and the Local Government Association (LGA).

== Membership ==
The membership of London Councils comprises the 32 London borough councils, the City of London Corporation, the London Fire and Emergency Planning Authority and the Mayor's Office for Policing and Crime.

The GLA was a member of the ALG for a period, before Mayor Ken Livingstone fell out with leading councillors and withdrew in 2001. The two organisations co-ordinate their work.

=== Executive and lead members ===
As of December 2025, the members of the executive committee of London Councils is as follows:

Member	Party	Borough
Claire Holland (chair)	Labour	Lambeth
Cllr Grace Williams (deputy chair)	Labour	Waltham Forest
Cllr Elizabeth Campbell (Vice Chair)	Conservative	Kensington and Chelsea
Cllr Gareth Roberts (Vice Chair)	Liberal Democrat	Richmond upon Thames
Deputy Chris Hayward (Vice Chair)	Independent	City of London
Mayor Brenda Dacres	Labour	Lewisham
Mayor Jason Perry	Conservative	Croydon
Cllr Ian Edwards	Conservative	Hillingdon
Cllr Anthony Okereke	Labour	Greenwich
Cllr Muhammad Butt	Labour	Brent
Cllr Shantanu Rajawat	Labour	Hounslow
Cllr Peter Mason	Labour	Ealing

=== Group whips ===
- Clyde Loakes, Labour, Waltham Forest
- Paul Osborn, Conservative, Harrow
- Andreas Kirsch, Liberal Democrat, Kingston

== Purpose ==
London Councils is the collective of London local government, the 32 boroughs and the City of London Corporation. They come together through London Councils to work in collaboration to deliver their shared ambitions for London and Londoners. A Cross-party organisation, London Councils shared ambitions are agreed by the Leaders' Committee, comprising the leaders and directly elected mayors of the boroughs, and the Chair of the Policy and Resources Committee at the City of London Corporation.

It supports collaboration between boroughs as well as working as a trusted partner with central government, the Mayor of London, the voluntary and business sectors, and public sector partners such as the NHS, to achieve a better future for London and Londoners.

Its services include the Freedom Pass, Taxicard, Health Emergency Badge and a grants programme for voluntary sector organisations in London on behalf of members and supports London Tribunals.

London Councils is represented on the Local Government Leaders' Council by its chair.

== Leadership ==
=== Chair ===
The current Chair of London Councils is Cllr Claire Holland, Leader of Lambeth Council. She replaced the previous chair, Georgia Gould in July 2024.

Previous chairs were:

- Georgia Gould, Camden, 2020–2024
- Peter John OBE, Southwark, 2018 – 2020
- Claire Kober, Haringey, Labour, 2016–2018
- Mayor Jules Pipe, Hackney, Labour, 2010–2016
- Merrick Cockell, Kensington and Chelsea, Conservative, 2006–2010
- Mayor Sir Robin Wales, Newham, Labour, 2000–2006
- Toby Harris, Haringey, Labour, 1995–2000

=== Leaders' Committee ===
London Councils is run by a committee made up of all the leaders of London's borough councils and meet each month (except August) to discuss and agree policy issues of importance to Londoners and their councils. The committee is supported by a cross-party executive of twelve senior members which acts as a forum for detailed policy development. Each member of the executive holds a specific policy area portfolio. Politically, the Executive comprises councillors in proportion to the party representation on London councils.

=== Other committees ===
- London Boroughs Grants Committee (from 1 April 2000)
- Transport and Environment Committee (from 1 April 2000) took over Freedom Pass from Transport Committee for London.
- London Housing Unit Committee (from 1 April 2000 until 31 March 2008) was a "sectoral joint committee" and not all London borough councils were members.
- Audit Committee

== London Office of Technology and Innovation (LOTI) ==
The London Office of Technology and Innovation (LOTI) was established in July 2019.

Originally formed of 15 boroughs, LOTI's membership has grown to include 27 boroughs, the Greater London Authority and London Councils.

The LOTI community is supported by a team hosted at London Councils. Its operations are funded by through an annual subscription from borough councils and grants from the GLA, London Councils and other partners.

In order to represent the best interests of its members, LOTI is technology and supplier agnostic. It does not favour or endorse the products and services of any one company. Nor does it procure technology on behalf of London boroughs. Its purpose is to help ensure local government staff are good, informed and demanding customers of the best innovation the market can provide.

== See also ==
- List of electoral wards in Greater London
- Local Government Association
