= The Key (smartcard) =

Contactless smartcard used in British public transport

- Govia Thameslink Railway's Key smartcard being held near a smartcard reader integrated into a station ticket barrier.
- Location: United Kingdom
- Launched: May 2007; 19 years ago
- Technology: ITSO contactless smartcard
- Operator: Go-Ahead Group
- Manager: Go-Ahead Group
- Validity: National Rail; Various bus operators

The Key is a contactless ITSO-compatible smartcard developed by the Go-Ahead Group used on buses, trains and other forms of public transport across various areas of the United Kingdom.

The Key uses near-field communication to electronically store and transmit information about rail and bus tickets for use on several operators across the UK. It was initially introduced in June 2007 by the Oxford Bus Company to simplify bus ticketing across their services. It has since spread to a multitude of other services, primarily run by the Go-Ahead Group, who are the parent company of the Oxford Bus Company.

The Key brand is owned and operated by the Go-Ahead Group. The Key is available to customers on the majority of the deregulated bus services operated by the Go-Ahead Group in towns and cities across England. Due to it being ITSO-compatible, it can also be used across the entire UK rail network.

Customers may order a Key smartcard free of charge or for a small charge from all operators that accept The Key, or from any Southern, Thameslink and Great Northern railway station ticket office. The Key functions across all operators that use it, regardless of where it was obtained.

From March 2020 until late 2022, Govia Thameslink Railway (GTR) operated 12 Key smartcard kiosks. These were standalone, self-operated machines that could issue standard adult Key smartcards by providing your personal details. These were removed when all GTR ticket offices were updated to support vending new smartcards. Before their removal, the kiosks were present at Bedford, Brighton, Eastbourne, Haywards Heath, Hitchin, Horsham, Luton, St Albans City, St Neots, Stevenage, Three Bridges and Worthing stations.

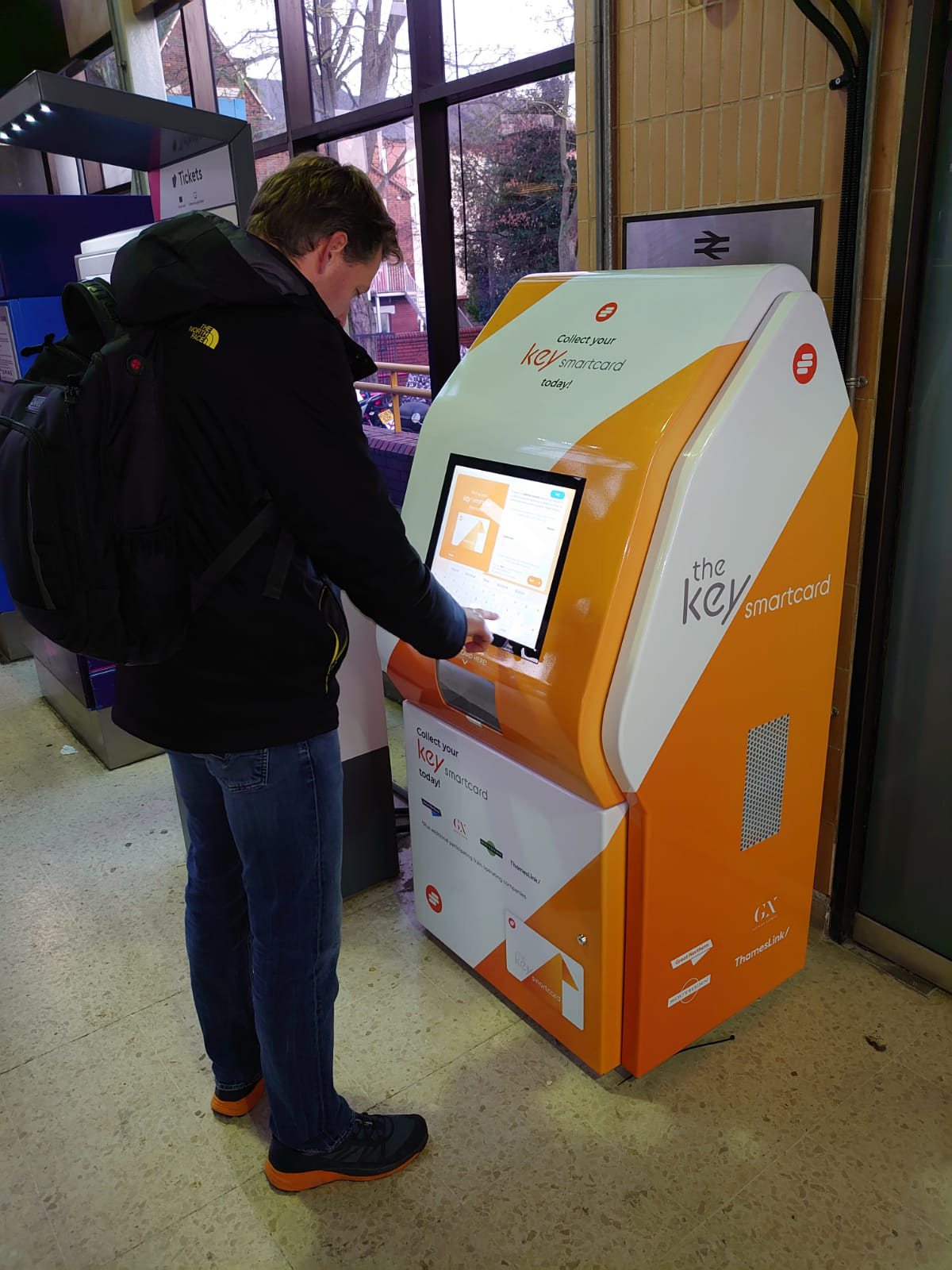
One of GTR's now-removed Key smartcard kiosks at a station

== keyGo ==
Map showing keyGo validity across Govia Thameslink Railway's network since June 2019.

Map showing keyGo validity across Southern's rail network in May 2015.

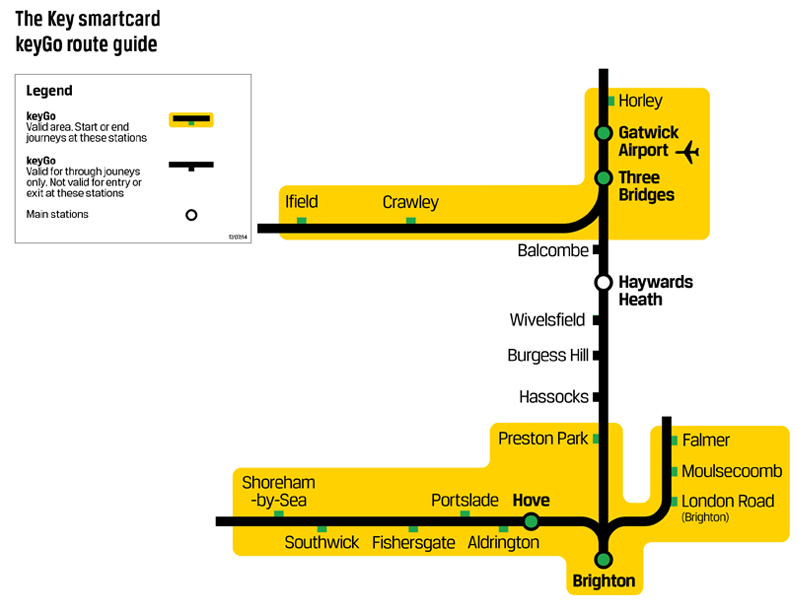
Map showing keyGo validity across Southern's rail network in March 2015.

keyGo is a pay-as-you-go system which can be added to Key smartcards provided by Govia Thameslink Railway. It is also valid for pay-as-you-go and PlusBus travel on some MetroBus and Brighton & Hove buses, as well as on GTR services between many stations on their network.

keyGo was introduced in August 2014, initially only covering a small area of Southern's rail network, expanding to cover the majority of East and West coastway and Brighton Mainline routes (excluding TfL zones) in May 2015. keyGo can also be used on Great Western Railway services between Redhill and Dorking Deepdene, including break of journey.

From 24 January 2018, keyGo can be used on all Govia Thameslink Railway brands (Thameslink, Southern, Gatwick Express and Great Northern) within the keyGo validity area, as well as on Southern services towards London.

From 22 April 2024, keyGo will automatically cap point-to-point journeys made from Monday to Monday at their weekly season price.

From 23 May 2024, was made available for use on South Western Railway services between Dorking and Epsom. This validity on South Western Railway was extended to cover journeys between Dorking and Clapham Junction in January 2025.

=== Credit balance ===
keyGo initially used a prepaid credit-balance system similar to London's Oyster card. This worked by charging an initial £25 charge when activating keyGo as an initial balance, with additional £25 top-ups being taken automatically when the card's balance goes below £5. A minimum balance of £5 was required for keyGo to be used for travel.

Customers could also top up their keyGo balance at Payzone locations within the keyGo validity area. At Payzone locations, customer could top up their keyGo balance by any amount between £5 and £100.

From 24 January 2018, keyGo moved from a pay-as-you-go system to a post-pay system, where customers' linked payment methods are charged directly as opposed to depleting credit. Existing credit balances would be used before attempting to charge a linked payment method. Customers can also have any positive balance on their keyGo account refunded to them through the keyGo section of Southern or Thameslink's websites.

From 13 February 2021, customers can no longer add credit to their keyGo balance at Payzone locations.

=== Usage ===
Users of keyGo tap in and out when entering and exiting railway stations or riding buses within the keyGo area, and the cheapest possible fare is automatically calculated for all journeys made throughout the day at 4:30am.

keyGo can also be used to extend existing tickets loaded onto The Key, meaning that season ticket users and day ticket users are only charged for travel beyond their smart ticket's validity.

=== Incomplete journeys ===
Until 24 January 2018, there was no way to correct an incomplete journey without contacting Southern customer services. In the case of an incomplete journey, where a customer has forgotten to tap in or out, or has not done so within the maximum journey time allowed of 4 hours and 35 minutes, a penalty fare of £25 was charged.

From 24 January 2018, customers can amend incomplete journeys themselves from their online account to fill in missed touches to prevent a penalty fare being charged. Journeys must be amended before the Wednesday after the journey was made, otherwise a penalty fare of £25 will be charged. Only three journeys can be amended in a 28 day period. Additional amendments must be made by contacting GTR's customer service team.

The keyGo system will attempt to auto-fill missing touches based on the customer's journey history with the Key and any valid tickets held on the smartcard at the time.

From 27 March 2023, the incomplete journey charge was increased to £50, and journeys can only be amended within 48 hours after traveling. Collection of incomplete journey charges from this date onwards will also be automated, whereas previously they had to be manually collected by a member of Govia Thameslink Railway staff.

=== Railcards ===
keyGo was not capable of providing railcard discounts when it was first released.

On 2 September 2020, GTR announced that select railcards may be added to an online keyGo account to provide discounts on rail and PlusBus transport. Railcards must be approved by GTR before discounts are applied.

=== Technology ===
The ITSO standard provides a system for transit via credit balances named stored travel rights, but keyGo does not use this facility for its ticketing. keyGo stores itself as a period pass (season ticket) on the ITSO smartcard with no origin or destination. This period pass is then read by ITSO-compatible smartcard readers within the keyGo area, and interpreted as valid authority to travel.

On rail, the smartcard reader will update the card with a transient ticket, adding either the origin or destination points on such a transient ticket as appropriate.

On buses, no transient ticket is added or updated on the smartcard. Instead, travel data, including the smartcard number, bus route number, and touch-on point, is uploaded to the Go-Ahead keyGo system at the end of the bus's journey, and the back-office system will calculate the appropriate fare for the combination of rail and bus journeys made each day.

=== Differences between normal tickets and keyGo ===
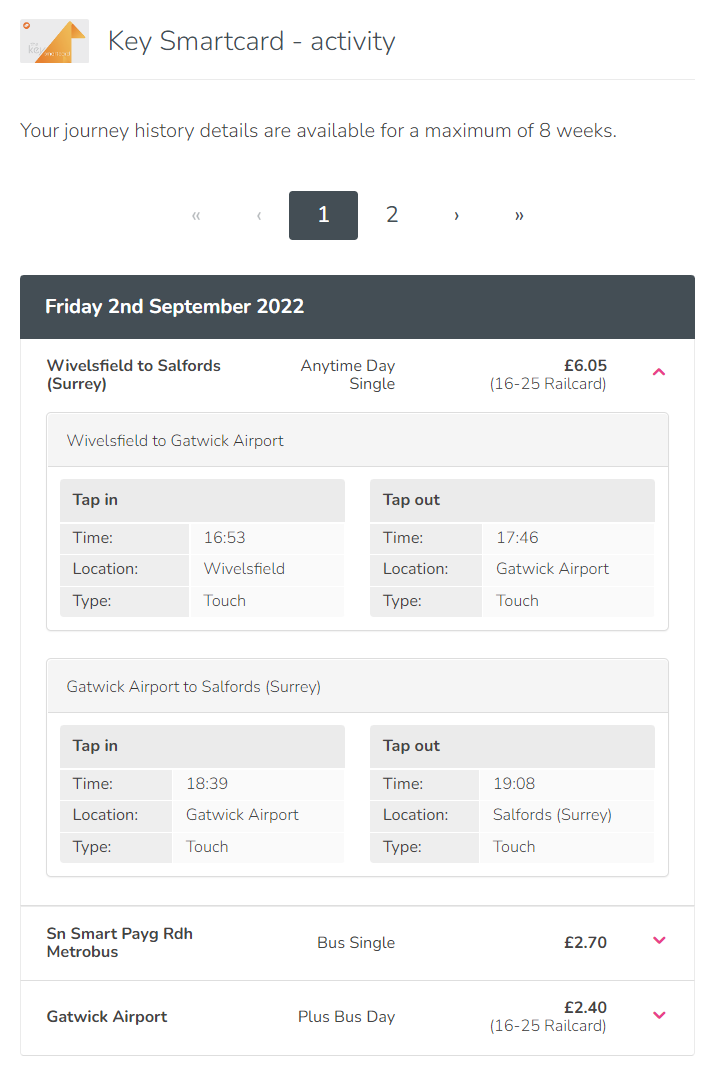
A screenshot of travel history on GTR's keyGo.

Due to the nature of keyGo's tap-on tap-off system, there are some differences between its usage and standard railway tickets.

==== PlusBus with break of journey ====
According to PlusBus' terms and conditions, PlusBus can only be issued for a ticket's origin or destination points, meaning that if a passenger wishes to break their journey at an intermediary station, PlusBus may not be issued for that area. keyGo, however, is not set up with this limitation, allowing PlusBus to be charged for travel on buses for intermediary stations.

==== Circuitous routes ====
keyGo's terms and conditions do not address the need to follow a permitted route for journeys you make, instead only stating that you "must always touch 'in' and touch 'out' with your Key Smartcard" and that "your journey must be completed within 4 hours and 36 minutes of the start of your journey" for a journey to be considered a valid journey.

Additionally, the terms explicitly address the process of ticket inspections while travelling in section 4, stating that during such checks "The Smartcard will be checked for any valid tickets, travelling within the keyGo network Area and that the Smartcard has been validated [...] at the start of the Journey." and that "[if] there are no valid tickets, you are travelling outside the keyGo Network Area as specified in condition 7 or the Smartcard has not been validated" that a passenger is liable to pay a penalty fare.

As long as a passenger is within the keyGo network area and has touched in no more than 4 hours and 36 minutes ago, their smartcard is deemed as a valid ticket no matter where they are within the keyGo network area, allowing them to use typically invalid routings, or travel across the network for extended periods of time (provided they have not exited any stations, where they must touch out) while only completing their journey very close to their origin point to avoid paying a higher fare.

== Interoperability with Oyster card ==
Initially, ITSO was not compatible with London's Oyster card system. A 2006 report commissioned by the UK Department for Transport found that "interoperability is possible, given sufficient budget and the overall will to achieve it".

On 6 August 2014, Southern Railway began selling London Travelcard season tickets fulfilled via The Key at stations, with online ticket sales being available from 20 August 2014. Day tickets across London and London Travelcards were made available from 19 September 2014.

=== ITSO on Prestige (IoP) project ===
On 28 May 2009, the Department for Transport funded a Transport for London (TfL) project to make London's Oyster system fully interoperable with ITSO smartcards across, named ITSO on Prestige (IoP). This project ran alongside Govia's investment in the South East Flexible Ticketing scheme (SEFT) to provide ITSO ticket acceptance capability at 90 stations outside London.

As part of the IoP project, TfL joined as an ITSO member. TfL estimated that providing ITSO capability across all of their services would require the procurement of 20,000 new smart ticket readers within their controlled station facilities and buses.

By 21 October 2013, TfL had upgraded smartcard readers at four National Rail stations to accept ITSO-based tickets: London Victoria, London Bridge, Clapham Junction and East Croydon.

On 19 September 2014, TfL and Southern Railway announced that all National Rail ITSO-compatible smartcards were now able to be used across TfL services on Oyster validators, where a valid ticket was present, including for day tickets, such as London Day Travelcards.

== Bus and rail operators accepting The Key ==
As of 21 January 2013, the position is:

Full range of ticket types means that tickets can be purchased for single rides, daily, weekly, monthly and season tickets.

Mode of Transport	Region	Introduction	Zones	Accepting transport operators	Ticket types	Comments
Bus	Bournemouth and Dorset	January 2012	7	Wilts & Dorset	Full range	Zonal coverage includes overlap with Bluestar Buses
Bus	Brighton & Hove	September 2011	Single	Brighton & Hove	Full range	Includes MetroBus services within the area and The Big Lemon.
Bus	Crawley and Surrey, Sussex and Kent region	January 2012	4	Metrobus	Full range	
Bus	Isle of Wight	April 2012	Single	Southern Vectis	Full Range	
Bus	Newcastle, Sunderland and North East region	July 2010 (pilot) April 2011 (full rollout)	7	Go North East	Full Range	
Bus	Oxford	Initially introduced June 2007 Converted to ITSO-compatible in October 2010; August 2011, Oxford SmartZone launched adding Stagecoach	3	Oxford Bus Company; Brookes Buses; Thames Travel; Stagecoach	Full range	Cityzone does not cover Stagecoach buses
Bus	Plymouth	August 2011	2	Plymouth Citybus	Full range	
Bus	Southampton and Hampshire	January 2012	7	Unilink; Bluestar Buses	Full range Full range	Zonal coverage includes overlap with More Buses / Salisbury Reds (Wilts and Dorset)
Rail	Sussex, Surrey, London, Bedfordshire, Hertfordshire	October 2011	n/a	Southern, Thameslink, Gatwick Express and Great Northern (GTR)	Loaded tickets valid across entire National Rail network keyGo - limited area||	
Rail	South East England	December 2016	n/a	Southeastern	Full Range	A purple child pass for 5-15 year olds is in development.
Rail, Bus, Tram and Underground	London	Limited station acceptance from 21 October 2013. Full integration for valid tickets from 19 September 2014. See Interoperability with Oyster card	1 to 6	Transport for London	London Travelcards only	London Travelcards must be purchased from a National Rail station located outside of Zones 1-6 to be valid.

== Statistics ==
By September 2013, The Key had been issued to over 420,000 customers and was being used over 120,000 times each day.

== See also ==
- ITSO
- List of smart cards
- Oyster card
