= CPAY =

Contactless payment system for transport in London

CPAY is the codename of the contactless payment system operated by Transport for London in and around London. It does not have a public facing brand name and is simply known as pay as you go by contactless by the public. The model has been copied around the world.

== History ==
In 2014, Transport for London became the first public transport provider in the world to accept payment from contactless bank cards. TfL first started accepting contactless debit and credit cards on London Buses on 13 December 2012, expanding to the Underground, Tram and the Docklands Light Railway in September 2014. Since 2016, contactless payment can also take place using contactless-enabled mobile devices such as phones and smartwatches, using Apple Pay, Google Pay and Samsung Pay.

TfL designed and coded the contactless payment system in-house, at a cost of £11 million, after realising existing commercial solutions were inflexible or too focused on retail use. Since the launch of contactless payment in 2012, over 500 million journeys have been made, using over 12 million contactless bank cards. Consequently, TfL is now one of Europe's largest contactless merchants, with around 1 in 10 contactless transactions in the UK taking place on the TfL network.

In 2016, TfL licensed their contactless payment system to Cubic, the original developers of the Oyster card, allowing the technology to be sold to other transport providers worldwide. In 2017, licensing deals were signed with New York City, New South Wales and Boston.

The same requirement to touch in and out on underground services applies to contactless cards. The same price capping that applies to the use of Oyster cards applies to the use of contactless cards (provided the same card is used for the day's journeys). The fare paid every day is settled with the bank and appears on the debit or credit card statement. Detailed usage data is written to Transport for London's systems and is available for customers who register their contactless cards with Transport for London. Unlike an Oyster card, a contactless card does not store credit (beyond the holder's credit limit) and there is no need or facility to add credit to the card.

In August 2019 Brookmans Park railway station was the first contactless-only addition to the pay as you go area. All subsequent additions located beyond fare zones 1-9 have followed suit.

== Features ==
Although the use of a contactless payment card for travel is exactly the same as an Oyster card, as a contactless card cannot be written into, they work differently in the background.

An Oyster card stores the balance in the card itself, and records all the touches made in the card. It can also store discounts and season tickets as well. None of the above is possible with a contactless payment card, therefore all the fare calculations are done in batch on the back end, after all the touches in a day are aggregated from the readers.

=== Daily and weekly capping ===
Like an Oyster card, contactless cards offer daily capping. However, the capping on Oyster cards are done in real-time, with the zones used stored inside the card, which is not possible on contactless. As the fares are calculated in batch by the back end for contactless cards, cheaper non-zonal caps may be available on contactless cards for certain stations.

In addition, due to how Oyster system works, if you start from zone 6 for one journey into zone 1, then stay within zone 1 all day, the Oyster system will charge you up to the zones 1-6 cap, but on contactless, if the zones 1-2 cap plus the single extension from zone 6 is cheaper, it will charge that instead since the back end looks for the whole day of the journey history and charges as a batch.

Contactless cards also offer weekly capping as well, which was not available initially on Oyster due to the real-time nature and the information stored on the card.

Since 27 September 2021, the back end processing used for contactless payments has also been applied on adult-rate Oyster cards, which enables weekly capping for these cards as well. Any overcharging compared to a contactless payment card, like the scenarios described above, will be refunded automatically to the Oyster card.

=== Unpaid fares ===
As the amount to be charged isn't known after travelling, at first use of a card, a pre-authorisation of £0.10 is requested on the card to check if it is valid. If the actual fare requested after the day is declined, the card is temporarily blocked for use until the unpaid fare is paid.

== Use ==
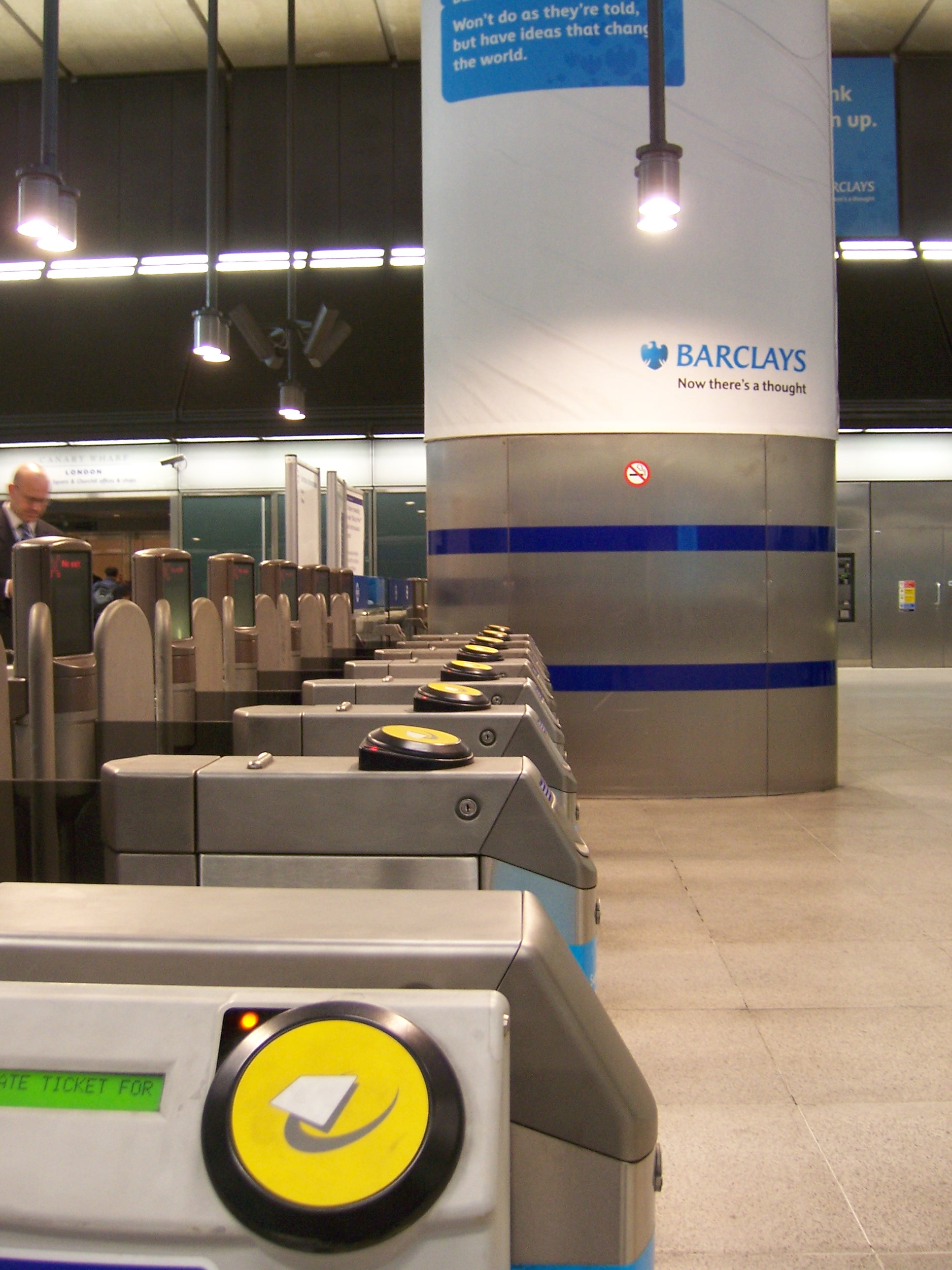
Oyster and contactless card readers on London Underground ticket barriers at Canary Wharf

The use of a contactless payment card by travellers is exactly the same as with an Oyster card. However, unlike an Oyster card, a contactless payment card can only be used for paying as you go at the adult rate. Season tickets and discounts cannot be associated with a contactless payment card.

== Coverage ==
=== Existing ===
CPAY (contactless pay as you go) is available everywhere an Oyster card is accepted. In addition, it is available at the following National Rail stations, where Oyster card is not accepted:

Station	Local authority	Managed by	Valid from	Notes
Apsley	Dacorum	London Northwestern Railway	February 2025	
Ashford	Spelthorne	South Western Railway	February 2025	
Ashtead	Mole Valley	Southern	December 2025	also served by South Western Railway
Aylesbury	Buckinghamshire	Chiltern Railways	December 2025	
Aylesbury Vale Parkway	Buckinghamshire	Chiltern Railways	December 2025	
Baldock	North Hertfordshire	Great Northern	December 2025	
Basildon	Basildon	c2c	February 2025	
Bat & Ball	Sevenoaks	Southeastern	February 2025	Only served by Thameslink
Beaulieu Park	Chelmsford	Greater Anglia	March 2026	
Beaconsfield	Buckinghamshire	Chiltern Railways	June 2024	
Benfleet	Castle Point	c2c	February 2025	
Berkhamsted	Dacorum	London Northwestern Railway	February 2025	
Billericay	Basildon	Greater Anglia	March 2026	
Bishops Stortford	East Hertfordshire	Greater Anglia	March 2026	also served by Stansted Express
Bletchley	Milton Keynes	London Northwestern Railway	February 2025	
Bourne End	Buckinghamshire	Great Western Railway	May 2022	
Box Hill & Westhumble	Mole Valley	Southern	December 2025	also served by South Western Railway
Bricket Wood	St Albans	London Northwestern Railway	February 2025	
Brookmans Park	Welwyn Hatfield	Great Northern	August 2019	
Burnham	Slough	Elizabeth line	January 2020	
Chalkwell	Southend-on-Sea	c2c	February 2025	
Cheddington	Buckinghamshire	London Northwestern Railway	February 2025	
Chelmsford	Chelmsford	Greater Anglia	March 2026	
Cookham	Windsor & Maidenhead	Great Western Railway	May 2022	
Datchet	Windsor & Maidenhead	South Western Railway	February 2025	
Denham	Buckinghamshire	Chiltern Railways	June 2024	
Denham Golf Club	Buckinghamshire	Chiltern Railways	June 2024	
Dorking	Mole Valley	Southern	December 2025	also served by South Western Railway
Dormans	Tandridge	Southern	December 2025	
Dunton Green	Sevenoaks	Southeastern	February 2025	
East Grinstead	Mid Sussex	Southern	December 2025	
East Tilbury	Thurrock	c2c	February 2025	
Egham	Runnymede	South Western Railway	February 2025	
Eynsford	Sevenoaks	Southeastern	February 2025	Only served by Thameslink
Furze Platt	Windsor & Maidenhead	Great Western Railway	May 2022	
Garston	Watford	London Northwestern Railway	February 2025	
Gerrards Cross	Buckinghamshire	Chiltern Railways	June 2024	
Great Missenden	Buckinghamshire	Chiltern Railways	December 2025	
Harlington	Central Bedfordshire	Thameslink	December 2025	
Harlow Mill	Harlow	Greater Anglia	March 2026	
Harlow Town	Harlow	Greater Anglia	March 2026	also served by Stansted Express
Harpenden	St Albans	Thameslink	October 2019	
Hatfield	Welwyn Hatfield	Great Northern	November 2019	also served by Thameslink
Hatfield Peverel	Braintree	Greater Anglia	March 2026	
Hemel Hempstead	Dacorum	London Northwestern Railway	February 2025	
Henley-on-Thames	South Oxfordshire	Great Western Railway	March 2022	
High Wycombe	Buckinghamshire	Chiltern Railways	June 2024	
Hitchin	North Hertfordshire	Great Northern	December 2025	
Hockley	Rochford	Greater Anglia	March 2026	
How Wood	St Albans	London Northwestern Railway	February 2025	
Hurst Green	Tandridge	Southern	December 2025	
Ingatestone	Brentwood	Greater Anglia	March 2026	
Iver	Buckinghamshire	Elizabeth line	January 2020	
Kempton Park	Spelthorne	South Western Railway	February 2025	
Kings Langley	Three Rivers	London Northwestern Railway	February 2025	
Knebworth	North Hertfordshire	Great Northern	December 2025	
Laindon	Basildon	c2c	February 2025	
Langley	Slough	Elizabeth line	January 2020	
Leagrave	Luton	Thameslink	December 2025	
Leatherhead	Mole Valley	Southern	December 2025	also served by South Western Railway
Leigh-on-Sea	Southend-on-Sea	c2c	February 2025	
Leighton Buzzard	Central Bedfordshire	London Northwestern Railway	February 2025	
Letchworth Garden City	North Hertfordshire	Great Northern	December 2025	
Lingfield	Tandridge	Southern	December 2025	
Little Kimble	Buckinghamshire	Chiltern Railways	December 2025	
Luton	Luton	Thameslink	December 2025	also served by East Midlands Railway
Luton Airport Parkway	Luton	Thameslink	October 2019	also served by East Midlands Railway
Maidenhead	Windsor & Maidenhead	Great Western Railway	January 2020	also served by Elizabeth line
Marlow	Buckinghamshire	Great Western Railway	May 2022	
Monks Risborough	Buckinghamshire	Chiltern Railways	December 2025	
Otford	Sevenoaks	Southeastern	February 2025	Also served by Thameslink
Oxted	Tandridge	Southern	December 2025	
Park Street	St Albans	London Northwestern Railway	February 2025	
Pitsea	Basildon	c2c	February 2025	
Princes Risborough	Buckinghamshire	Chiltern Railways	December 2025	
Prittlewell	Southend-on-Sea	Greater Anglia	March 2026	
Rayleigh	Rochford	Greater Anglia	March 2026	
Reading	Reading	Network Rail	January 2020	Pay-as-you-go only valid on Great Western Railway and Elizabeth line services
Reigate	Reigate and Banstead	Southern	December 2025	Also served by GWR
Rochford	Rochford	Greater Anglia	March 2026	
Roydon	Epping Forest	Greater Anglia	March 2026	
Saunderton	Buckinghamshire	Chiltern Railways	December 2025	
Sawbridgeworth	East Hertfordshire	Greater Anglia	March 2026	
Seer Green & Jordans	Buckinghamshire	Chiltern Railways	June 2024	
Sevenoaks	Sevenoaks	Southeastern	February 2025	Also served by Thameslink
Shepperton	Spelthorne	South Western Railway	February 2025	
Shiplake	South Oxfordshire	Great Western Railway	March 2022	
Shoeburyness	Southend-on-Sea	c2c	February 2025	
Shoreham	Sevenoaks	Southeastern	February 2025	Only served by Thameslink
Slough	Slough	Great Western Railway	January 2020	also served by Elizabeth line
Southend Airport	Rochford	London Southend Airport	March 2026	served by Greater Anglia
Southend Central	Southend-on-Sea	c2c	February 2025	
Southend East	Southend-on-Sea	c2c	February 2025	
Southend Victoria	Southend-on-Sea	Greater Anglia	March 2026	
St Albans Abbey	St Albans	London Northwestern Railway	February 2025	
St Albans City	St Albans	Thameslink	October 2019	
Staines	Spelthorne	South Western Railway	February 2025	
Stanford-le-Hope	Thurrock	c2c	February 2025	
Stansted Airport	Uttlesford	Greater Anglia	March 2026	also served by Stansted Express. Not valid on CrossCountry.
Stansted Mountfitchet	Uttlesford	Greater Anglia	March 2026	also served by Stansted Express
Stevenage	Stevenage	Great Northern	December 2025	
Stoke Mandeville	Buckinghamshire	Chiltern Railways	December 2025	
Sunbury	Spelthorne	South Western Railway	February 2025	
Sunnymeads	Windsor & Maidenhead	South Western Railway	February 2025	
Taplow	Buckinghamshire	Elizabeth line	January 2020	
Thorpe Bay	Southend-on-Sea	c2c	February 2025	
Tilbury Town	Thurrock	c2c	February 2025	
Tring	Dacorum	London Northwestern Railway	February 2025	
Twyford	Wokingham	Great Western Railway	January 2020	also served by Elizabeth line
Upper Halliford	Spelthorne	South Western Railway	February 2025	
Virginia Water	Runnymede	South Western Railway	February 2025	
Wargrave	Wokingham	Great Western Railway	March 2022	
Watford North	Watford	London Northwestern Railway	February 2025	
Watton-at-Stone	East Hertfordshire	Great Northern	December 2025	
Welham Green	Welwyn Hatfield	Great Northern	November 2019	
Welwyn Garden City	Welwyn Hatfield	Great Northern	November 2019	also served by Thameslink
Welwyn North	Welwyn Hatfield	Great Northern	December 2025	
Wendover	Buckinghamshire	Chiltern Railways	December 2025	
West Horndon	Brentwood	c2c	February 2025	
Westcliff	Southend-on-Sea	c2c	February 2025	
Wickford	Basildon	Greater Anglia	March 2026	
Windsor & Eton Central	Windsor & Maidenhead	Great Western Railway	March 2022	
Windsor & Eton Riverside	Windsor & Maidenhead	South Western Railway	February 2025	
Witham	Braintree	Greater Anglia	March 2026	
Woldingham	Tandridge	Southern	December 2025	
Wraysbury	Windsor & Maidenhead	South Western Railway	February 2025	

As the Oyster card supports a maximum of 15 zones the stations above are listed as zone 16 in the fares data, indicating they are outside the Oyster area. CPAY journeys from those stations are only capped for travel to Zones 1-6, 1-8 or 1-9.

The contactless payment system is also used to collect fares for journeys on the Luton DART, which can be reviewed on the TfL contactless portal but are not integrated with other journeys for fares purposes.

=== Future ===
Expansion of the CPAY area is currently being undertaken through a scheme named Project Oval. As of March 2026, 103 stations have been added through this scheme and the next tranche of stations (including 23 operated by Southeastern) is scheduled to go live later in 2026.

== Usage statistics ==
Since the launch of contactless payment in 2012 on buses, and in 2014 on rail, the usage has been steadily increasing apart during the period of COVID-19 pandemic. By October 2022, contactless payment is now used for 71% of tube, rail and bus journeys in London. Further analysis between July and August 2022 showed that 35% of contactless journeys were made using mobile devices, up from 26% before the pandemic.
