= Drusillas Zoo Park =

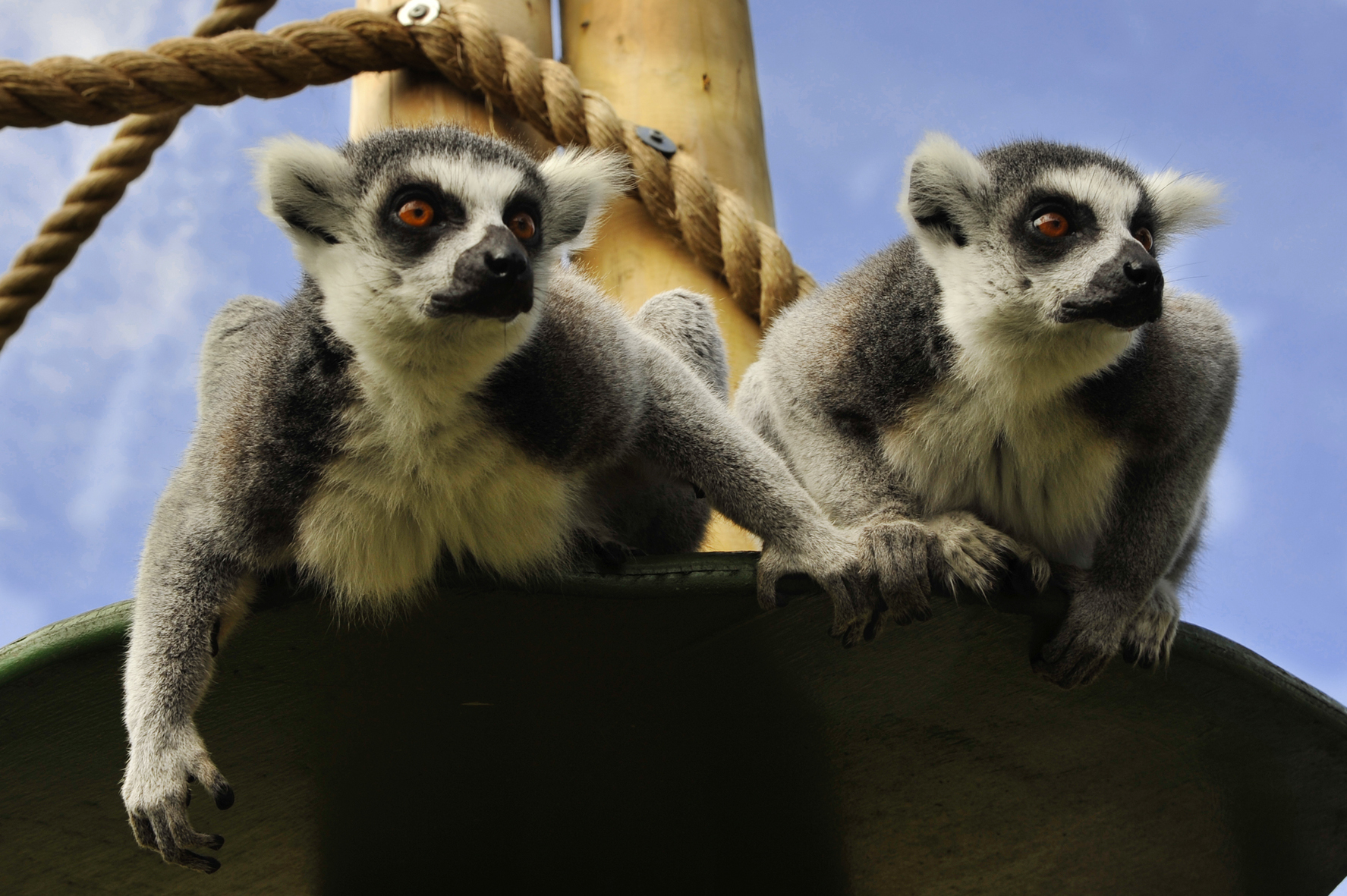
- Interactive map of Drusillas Zoo Park
- 50°49′26″N 0°9′46.8″E
- Date opened: 1920s
- Location: near Alfriston, East Sussex, England, United Kingdom
- Land area: 10 acres (4.0 ha)
- No. of animals: 1638
- No. of species: 196
- Annual visitors: 370,000
- Owner: Laurence and Christine Smith
- Website: drusillas.co.uk

Drusillas Zoo Park is a small 10 acres (4.0 ha) zoo near to Alfriston, East Sussex, England, United Kingdom. It attracts between 350,000 and 370,000 visitors per year and until December 2021, was home to the first Hello Kitty-themed attraction in Europe.

The zoo cares for both wild and domestic animals, including ring-tailed lemurs, meerkats, camels, giant anteaters and penguins. There are many hands-on activities, an adventure play area separated for different age groups: children under nine in one and ten and up in a different area, an indoor soft play centre, and the Safari Express train ride that runs daily and six other rides. There are also cafés, shops, and restaurants.

== History ==
The enterprise began in 1925 as "Drusilla's Tea Cottage", operated by Douglas Ann and his first wife Drusilla. Animals were included later. It was closed between April and November 1954 due to a fire. In 1959, management passed to Ann's sons. It is now owned by Laurence and Christine Smith, who bought it from the Ann family in 1997.

== Animals and attractions ==
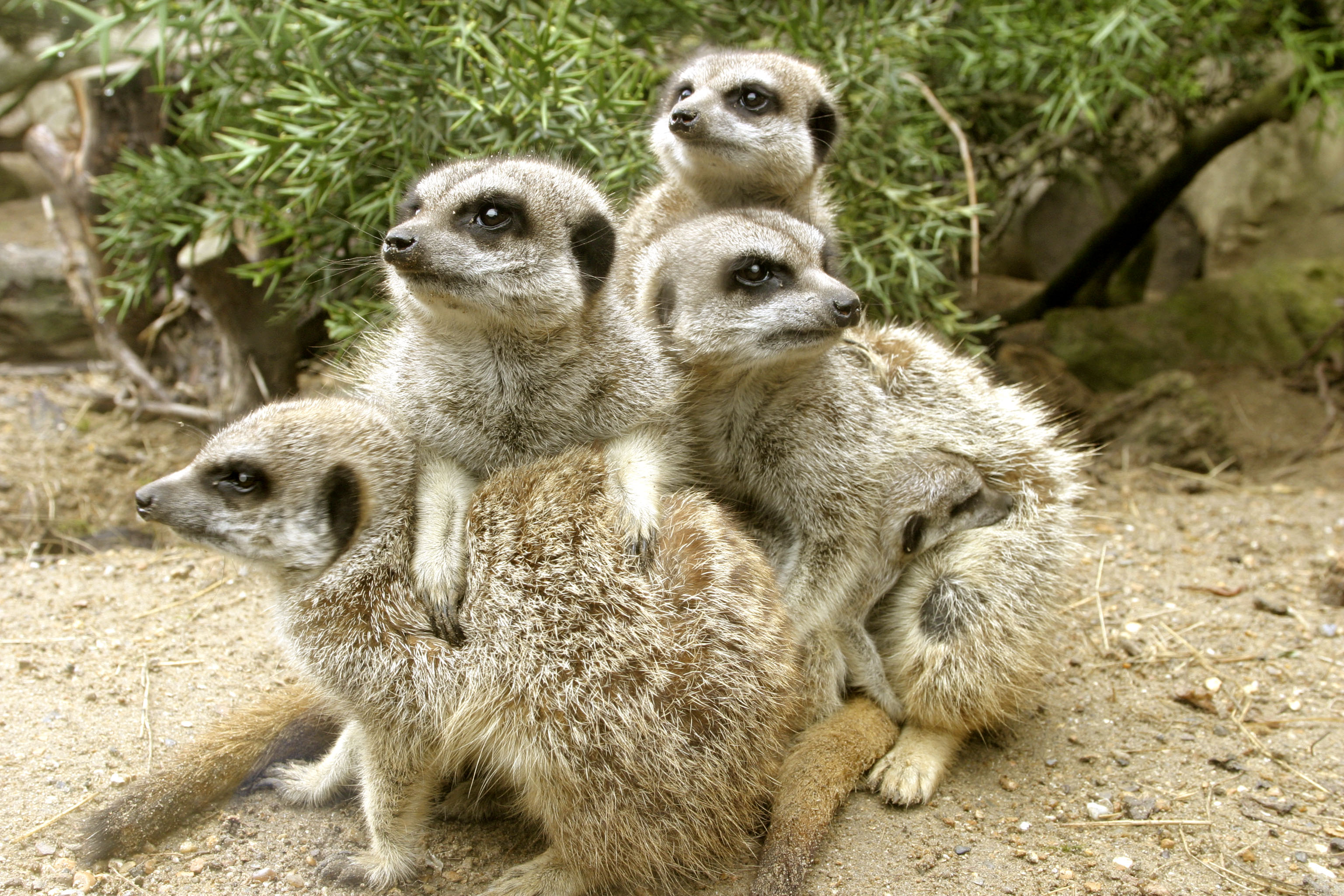
Meerkats at Drusillas

The zoo has gradually increased the number of animal exhibits, but still maintains a policy of having mainly smaller animals. The zoo keeps a range of primates including Sulawesi crested macaques, brown capuchin monkeys, black and white colobus monkeys, and lar gibbons. Other residents include servals, crested porcupines, Rodrigues fruit bats, Asian small-clawed otters, red pandas, Humboldt penguins, binturongs, Chilean flamingos, fennec foxes, rock hyraxes, two Bactrian camels named Lofty and Roxy and two giant anteaters. Other exhibits include Lemurland, a small farmyard, and a walk-through lorikeet aviary where visitors can feed nectar to the birds.

There is also a Discovery Centre, which contains various parts of animals such as pelts, horns, tusks and skins seized from customs.

The 'Zoolympics challenge' lets children compare their abilities (to drag, hang on, jump, shout, run, and hold their breath) against a variety of animals, and record them in a booklet given out for free at the entrance. Children can also get 'stamp books' to stamp using tick-shaped stamps found around the enclosures.

There are many interactive sections of the zoo including 'Mokomo's Jungle Rock' which opened in 2003 and features animatronic animals (mandrill, ring-tailed lemur, lappet-faced vulture, Nile crocodile, bird-eating spider and boa constrictor) who sing about the food chain in the style of The Lion Sleeps Tonight. Further along the route, there is an animatronic saltwater crocodile who sings "Never Smile at a Crocodile". Past the second crocodile is a cockatoo which mimics visitors' voices after saying something to it. There are also animatronic chickens in the farmyard who sing a song about handwashing.

The adventure play area has swings, slides, and climbing walls, and has been separated into Go Bananas! for children under six and Go Wild! for older children. The indoor soft play centre includes a café selling drinks and snacks. An interactive maze, Mungo's Maze, lets children discover different worlds, as helped along by a series of clues and mythical creatures.

== Go Safari! ==
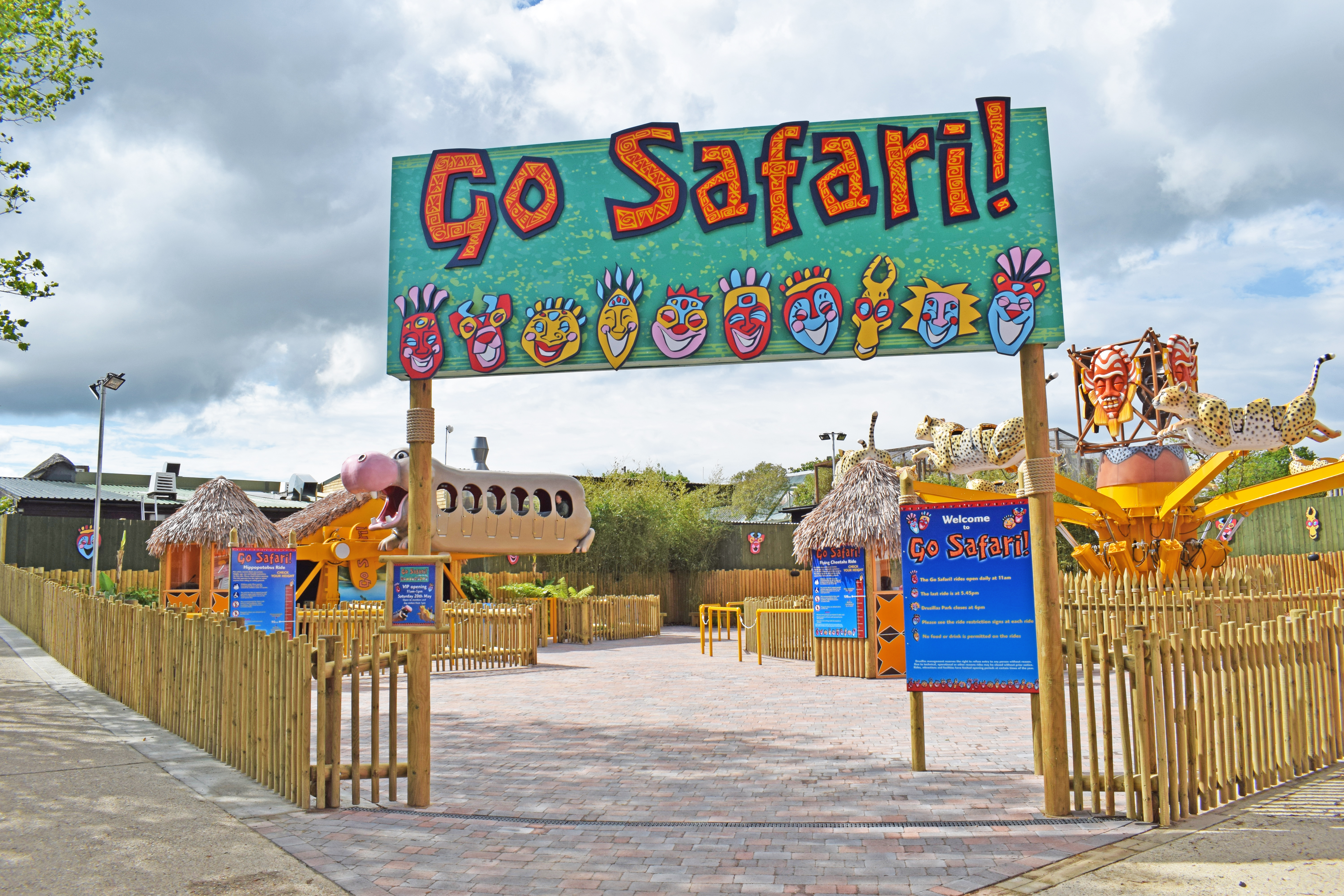
Drusillas Park's latest attraction, Go Safari!

Go Safari! is the biggest project ever undertaken by Drusillas, and represents a million pound investment for the Park. Taking over a year to prepare, the attraction opened in May 2017.

In 2007, Drusillas Park introduced a permanent Thomas & Friends train ride after securing a long-term deal with HIT Entertainment. The passenger train ran to and from Tidmouth Hault (now Mungo's Central Station) for 10 years, from Saturday 31 March 2007 until Sunday 8 January 2017, when the Thomas contract expired without being renewed.

The Safari Express train replaced Thomas at the Park from Friday 31 March 2017, with two further rides replacing the Explorers Lagoon (The Flying Cheetahs and Hippopotobus) opening on Sunday 21 May 2017. Combined, these three new attractions are collectively known as Go Safari!

== Hello Kitty Secret Garden ==
Drusillas Park had the first permanent Hello Kitty attraction in Europe: Hello Kitty Secret Garden, which replaced the old golf course in 2014.

Hello Kitty Secret Garden included three specially designed children's rides: a Hello Kitty car ride, a tea cup ride and a "reach for the sky" hopper ride.

In December 2021, Drusillas announced the end of the seven year partnership with Sanrio, and the closure of the Hello Kitty Secret Garden.

== Rainforest Adventure ==
In 2019, Drusillas opened the Rainforest Carousel, which features 30 rideable rainforest animals. To complement the carousel, the area and rides from the closed Hello Kitty Secret Garden were reworked into a new attraction called The Rainforest Adventure, which opened in May 2022. These consist of Toucan Twister, Amazon Skyrise and Jungle Jeeps.

== Awards and accolades ==
Rated top attraction in Southern England in The Daily Telegraph's '20 Great Family Days Out' (May 2014)

Shortlisted as 'The Best Theme Park Half-term Holidays' by The Times (May 2014)

Winner of the 2014 Visitor Attraction of the Year at the Sussex Life Food, Drink and Hospitality Awards.

2014 Sussex Business Matters Award winner in Hospitality, Tourism and Leisure.
