= ITSO Ltd =

British non-profit membership organization

- Chairman: Alistair Smith
- Website: itso.org.uk
- Formerly called: Integrated Transport Smartcard Organisation

ITSO Ltd is a British non-profit membership organisation assisting standardisation of public transport ticketing in the United Kingdom.

Its objectives are to:

- maintain and develop the ITSO specification for transport smart cards
- operate and manage an interoperable smart media environment
- facilitate and support development of smart ticketing schemes that comply with the ITSO specification.

ITSO was established as a result of discussions between various UK passenger transport authorities concerning the lack of standards for interoperable smart card ticketing. These discussions grew to include other authorities, transport operators and government. ITSO membership covers the breadth of the transport sector including transport operators (bus, tram and train operating companies), suppliers to the industry, local authorities and public transport executives. Supported by the Department for Transport, ITSO has links with major transport industry organisations and established smart card schemes in the UK and overseas.

ITSO started out as the Integrated Transport Smartcard Organisation but this name has been dropped and is now just 'ITSO'. That is because the specification covers other forms of ticketing besides smartcards and transport.

The Department for Transport introduced in 2008 the English National Concessionary Travel Scheme for all people of retirement age and eligible disabled persons (according to the Transport Acts 1985 and 2000) using buses, which uses ITSO smart cards. Transport Scotland and the Welsh Government have implemented ITSO in their concessionary travel schemes.

== Specification ==
The ITSO specification is a technical platform on which interoperable smart ticketing schemes can be built. It defines the key technical items and interfaces that are required to deliver interoperability between components of a ticketing system – smart media (smart cards), points of service and back offices – and separate ticketing systems. ITSO is unique in transport smart card specifications in that it covers all these components.

== English National Concessionary Travel Scheme ==
The English National Concessionary Travel Scheme is a national scheme by the Department for Transport in conjunction with local authorities across England, in which ITSO worked to standardise and ensure interoperability of cards and readers. The ITSO logo features on the bottom right corner of the bus pass.

== Members ==
The ITSO member list includes most of the major bus operators, ticket issuing system vendors and passenger transport executives.

== Non-ITSO systems ==
The largest commercial-based scheme is by Transport for London, marketed as Oyster. TfL has funded Oyster readers for all London rail stations in zones 1-6, and the Department for Transport has worked with TfL to ensure the readers are compatible with the ITSO specification.

The UK's equivalent interoperability organisation for sectors other than transport ticketing is Lasseo, which provides an open specification for UK local authorities to add public services onto ITSO based cards. A Scottish consortium of local authorities looks at standard and interoperability issues in Scotland.

== ITSO on Mobile ==
In 2018, ITSO launched ITSO on Mobile, partnering with Google to allow passengers to buy and use ITSO tickets on their Android mobile phone. Transport operator members of ITSO can integrate ITSO on Mobile into their existing ITSO schemes, including their retail apps and websites. Purchased tickets are delivered to the Google Pay digital wallet on the phone. The first trials were in 2018 with West Midlands Metro.

ITSO on Mobile was made available for season tickets on West Midlands Metro as well as Transport for West Midlands' Network season tickets in February 2021, and the Tyne and Wear Metro in November 2020.

ITSO on Mobile is delivered by Yotra Ltd, a wholly owned subsidiary of ITSO Ltd that has been created to develop, deliver into service and then operate ITSO on Mobile.

== See also ==
- Smartcards on National Rail
- Smartcards on buses and trams in Great Britain
