= English National Concessionary Travel Scheme =

Free bus travel scheme in England

An example of a senior pass

The English National Concessionary Travel Scheme is a national scheme by the Department for Transport in conjunction with local authorities across England.

The scheme extended the provision of free bus travel within individual local authorities to allow travel throughout England from 1 April 2008. English residents who have attained the state pension age for women, which was gradually being increased from 60 to 66 by 2026, as well as eligible disabled residents, are eligible for free off-peak bus travel on weekdays and all day at weekends and bank holidays. Some local authorities offer extra benefits for use within their area, for example passes issued by Transport for West Midlands are additionally valid on the West Midlands Metro. Comparable schemes operate within Wales, Scotland and Northern Ireland.

There are two types of concessionary pass: the Senior pass with a blue panel at the right hand side of the pass, and a disabled person's pass with an orange panel.

A Senior pass is valid between 09:30 and 23:00 on weekdays and at any time at weekends and public holidays. An accessibility pass has the same statutory validity, but some authorities allow disabled persons to travel at additional times, and, nationally, in April 2027, the disabled people's pass will become usable at all times. Both types of pass are valid throughout England only, although some cross-border journeys which start or end in England are permitted.

Some authorities issue a companion pass with a "C+" in the top right corner, entitling a companion, not named and not necessarily the same person, to free travel while accompanying a pass-holder who cannot travel alone within the administrative areas of the pass issuer and of any other authority that accepts a companion pass from other areas.

== See also ==
- Freedom Pass
- Scottish National Entitlement Card
