= Visa Cash =

Visa Cash is a smart card electronic cash system, implemented as a stored-value card owned by Visa.

Trialled in various locations worldwide (including Leeds, UK in 1997), the system works via a 'chip' embedded in a bank card, and looks similar to the so-called 'Chip and PIN' cards issued, among other countries, in Europe. Another early trial was performed in conjunction with the World Ski Championship in Trondheim, Norway in late February 1997. Several different cards were issued, with loaded face values of 200, 250, 400 and 600 NOK. The cards expired Aug 97.

The card is 'loaded' with cash via specialized ATMs, and the cash can later be 'spent' by inserting the card into the retailer's card-reader and pressing a button to confirm the amount. Neither PIN entry nor a signature is required, which makes for a speedy transaction for the card's owner.

Other competing cashless payment systems for micro-payments (small amounts) include Mondex.

A more successful smart card electronic cash system is the Octopus card system in Hong Kong and in Singapore, first generation microchip Cashcard by Network for Electronic Transfers was introduced powered by Visa Cash when it was launched in 1997, it is currently still being used by motorists to pay their Electronic Road Pricing toll and carpark fees via IU reader in the car.

== See also ==
- Digital wallet
- Mondex
- Dexit (corporation)
- Octopus card
- OnePulse
- Oyster card
- Network for Electronic Transfers
- T-money(visacash Korea)
