= TaiwanMoney Card =

Former IC card in Taiwan

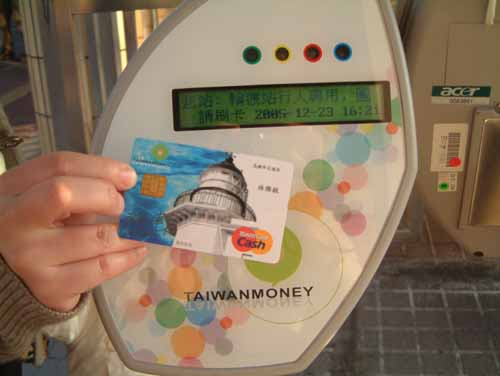
TaiwanMoney smartcard ticket checker

TaiwanMoney Card was a contactless Smart card in use in seven cities centred on the southern Taiwanese city of Kaohsiung. It was a combined credit card, electronic purse and public transport payment card, being the first such card when it was rolled out by its providers (MasterCard, Cathay United Bank and Acer e-Service) in June 2006.

== History ==
The Kaohsiung City transit authority selected a consortium led by Acer to run the program in 2003, testing began in 2005 before roll out in 2006.

== Technology ==
The technology used was based on the Mondex system.

== Network ==
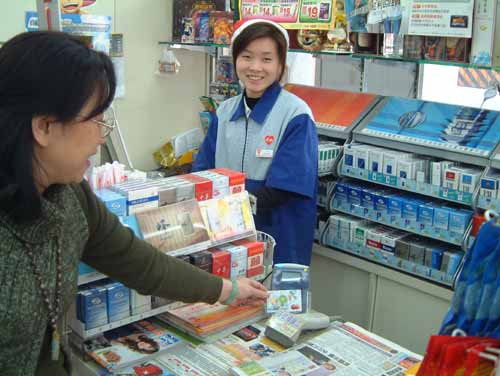
The TaiwanMoney smartcard can be used for small purchases from local convenience stores.

The TaiwanMoney card was widely accepted including the following:

- Kaohsiung Bus Management Service
- Kaohsiung City shipping company
- South East Bus Company (Operating 7 routes under contract to Kaohsiung City Buses)
- Kaohsiung Bus (including Tainan City Buses)
- Kuo-Kuang Motor Transport Company Ltd (Southern Highway Passenger Line)

== See also ==
- List of smart cards
- Octopus card
- OnePulse
