= TranSys =

- Owners: Cubic (37.5%); HP Enterprise Services (37.5%); Fujitsu (20%); WS Atkins (5%)

TranSys was a consortium of Cubic (37.5%), HP Enterprise Services (37.5%), Fujitsu (20%) and WS Atkins (5%). It operated the Oyster card scheme for Transport for London until 2008. The Oyster card system was originally created and maintained via a PFI contract known as 'Prestige' between TfL and TranSys. TranSys was responsible for developing, installing, managing and maintaining London's automated fare collection system including the Oyster card system, on behalf of TfL. The PFI contract was put in place in 1998 for a term of 17 years. In August 2008, TfL gave notice to terminate the contract with the TranSys consortium, exercising a break option, effective from 16 August 2010. A new contract was signed with Cubic for managing and maintaining the system.

== See also ==
- Oyster card
- MIFARE
