= Mondex =

Smart card cash system by Mastercard

Mondex was a smart card electronic cash system, implemented as a stored-value card and owned by Mastercard.

Pioneered by two bankers from NatWest in 1990, it was spun-off to a separate consortium later on, then sold to Mastercard.

Mondex allowed users to use its electronic card as they would with cash, enabling peer-to-peer offline transfers between cards, which did not need any authorization, via Mondex ATMs, computer card readers, personal 'wallets' and specialized telephones. This offline nature of the system and other unique features made Mondex stand out from leading competitors at the time, such as Visa Cash, which was a closed system and was much closer in concept to a traditional payment cards' transactional operation.

Mondex also allowed for a full-card locking mechanism, usage with multiple currencies within a single card, and a certain degree of user anonymity. Mondex cards were at some point common place in many universities at a certain point as they were mostly trialed there, and were also issued as multi-application cards - like combo credit cards, ID cards, and loyalty membership cards.

The system was introduced around the world in more than a dozen nations, with various differing implementations. Despite continuous investment from Mastercard, the Mondex scheme did not seem to catch on worldwide and the last place where it operated, Taiwan, had its cards disabled on 31 May 2008, being succeeded by a similar but more technologically advanced system, named Mastercard Cash, which utilized contactless operation, culminating in the TaiwanMoney Card.

The Mondex scheme was a forerunner in the cashless society that is common today via mobile payment, digital wallets, and contactless payment, and was far ahead of its time.

== History ==
The Mondex scheme was invented in 1990 by Tim Jones and Graham Higgins of NatWest in the United Kingdom. In March 1992 internal tests of the system, known at the time as 'Byte', started running at one of NatWest's major computer centres, Goodman's Fields in London.

Development continued in secret until December 1993, when the system was publicly unveiled with an announcement that the Midland Bank (which had recently been acquired by HSBC) had joined the scheme as a 50/50 investment partner.

Initial public trials of the payment system were carried out from July 1995 in Swindon, Wiltshire. The public phase had required the development and manufacture of numerous merchant devices and smart cards, with BT, NatWest and the Midland Bank sponsoring and installing retail terminals at the car parks, payphones, buses and at merchants in the town, and issuing Mondex cards to residents. Within the first five weeks of the trial, 1,900 terminals had reportedly been installed at 620 retailers, and 6,000 cardholders had signed up, with a target of 40,000 cardholders and 1,000 vendors being pursued during the course of the one-year trial. By September 1995, all buses, car parks and payphones were meant to accept Mondex, and 20 cashpoints and 300 payphones were meant to support funds transfers using the system.

In July 1996, NatWest and Midland Bank sold the intellectual property rights to develop the Mondex concept, technology, and brand to a new group called Mondex International, with 17 major banks joining the group as shareholders. From that point on, Mondex International managed the Mondex brand, oversaw its franchisees and signed contracts with new ones around the globe. It also managed the Mondex technology and developed its software.

In November that same year, Mastercard acquired 51% ownership of Mondex International and fully endorsed the Mondex scheme, promptly abandoning its own electronic cash system which had been in development up until then. Mastercard then acquired full ownership of the company in June 2001.

In 1996 Visa and Mastercard agreed to what was known as the Upper West Side trial. Visa deployed Visa Cash, their own electronic cash scheme, and Mastercard deployed Mondex to see if the people on Manhattan Island would embrace the concept and the technology as a means of replacing cash.

Mondex launched in a number of markets during the 1990s, expanding from the original trial in Swindon to Hong Kong, New York and Guelph, Canada. It was also trialled on several British university campuses from the late 1990s, including the University of Edinburgh, University of Exeter (between 1997 and 2001), University of York, University of Nottingham, Aston University and Sheffield Hallam University.

Throughout the late 90s and early 2000s trials continued to be executed throughout the world, with varying degrees of customer adoption and popularity. At the end, even the more successful of these trials failed their purpose, as most of the countries which had Mondex pilots never saw a national implementation of the system - in many locations the scheme stayed in an experimental phase until the local Mondex franchisee shut its doors.

== Operation ==
As a stored-value system, Mondex cards were designed as an electronic replacement for cash - they always held a certain value, allowing offline transactions to be possible without needing a line of credit or communication with the credit company, like with a traditional credit card. This way they were able to be offered to a sector that wasn't catered by traditional forms of electronic payment.

All value circulated between Mondex cards was issued by an 'originator' - in order to create Mondex value the originator (a part of the local Mondex franchise) would exchange cash with the Mondex partnering banks and provide them with an equal amount of Mondex electronic value, which could be later withdrawn by cardholders using the bank accounts associated to their cards.

=== Transfers, card top-up and payments ===
Mondex is an open-loop implementation of the electronic cash scheme - instead of transactions occurring only in one way, money can be transferred between any Mondex user.

A transfer of funds using the Mondex card (dubbed an 'electronic purse') operated through a Mondex-enabled device, and in principle occurred between 2 cards - whether it was 2 customers or a customer and a seller.

Both would insert their cards into a device which would facilitate the transfer of funds and record the transaction onto the card. The card's memory consisted of the last 10 transactions.

In order to top-up their cards, users could use an ATM, go to a bank branch, or visit several stores and businesses with compatible hardware. Mondex cards that were issued by banks allowed cardholders to transfer funds to and from their personal bank account, which was linked directly to their card.

Mondex cards could be used in any store or machine that supported it and had the necessary equipment. Depending on the country where the system was implemented, Mondex cards were accepted at a variety of businesses - supermarkets, department stores, public transport, taxis, car parks, vending machines, restaurants, cafés and many more. Some countries even allowed usage of the cards in lottery games.

=== International use ===
Mondex cards carried five 'electronic pockets', separate from one another, each containing money denominated in a different currency. This allowed transactions to be made using one of the 5 currencies loaded on the card. The currencies in the 'pockets' could be unloaded and replaced at any time.

=== Security features ===
Mondex cards included a locking mechanism - a PIN would be chosen and inserted to lock the card, and before operating the card again (to view the latest transactions or transfer funds) the cardholder had to insert his PIN and unlock it.

The Z notation was used to prove security properties about Mondex, allowing it to achieve ITSEC level E6, ITSEC's highest granted security-level classification.

== Card types ==
In many countries the electronic purse was issued on a multi-application card, implementing two or more uses within a single card.

In some instances, the Mondex card was issued alongside a regular credit card, allowing transactions to be made either with money stored in the Mondex wallet or via the traditional credit card.

Other multi-application uses included a user card in a private health service - holding personal health records and other details in cases of emergency; and a club membership card, containing special discounts and benefits. Mondex was also used in numerous locations as an Employee/Student ID, and as a mass-transit electronic ticket scheme (to be used for buying a ticket or storing a ticket bought in advance).

== Equipment ==
A number of devices allowed operation of Mondex cards (transferring value, viewing card balance, locking/unlocking cards, et cetera), to be used for either personal or commercial use:

- A balance reader - small keychain sized device that showed the current balance of a card. This device came with every Mondex card sold, so that customers could have an easy way to keep up with the balance loaded up on their card.
- An 'Electronic Wallet' - calculator-sized pocket device, allowing an individual to look at their card balance and recent transaction information, change PIN and lock their card, and with a 2-slot wallet - transfer funds between cards.
- An IC card reader - a simple computer peripheral which allowed a cardholder to manage their card and make transactions through the internet. It was operated entirely through a computer, and enabled a similar feature set to the electronic wallet when using its companion software.
- A payphone, for use with a Mondex card as a form of payment; some payphones had similar functions to the handheld wallet, and could be used to make transfers and look at balance and transaction history, lock a card and change its PIN. It was also possible to transfer money to and from the bank account linked to the card.
- A personal landline telephone, with 1 or 2 card slots, for transfers of funds between purses via the phone, or in person through the second card slot. Otherwise, it had a similar feature set to the payphone machines.
- A retailer terminal, housing the seller's card and another card slot for the customer's card, and containing a printer and a display. Intended for making transactions at stores as per any other purchase with a normal POS terminal - the customer's card would be inserted into the terminal and the appropriate funds would be transferred to the merchant's card inside. The terminal recorded the latest 300 transactions made with it.
- A 'Cashless ATM' - used like a normal ATM would be, with a Mondex card slot instead of cash withdrawal slot, had a similar feature set to the Mondex-enabled telephones, and like them allowed transfer of funds to and from an associated bank account.
- A 'Value-Box' - a cash-safe equivalent situated at a bank branch, containing large numbers of Mondex cards to facilitate any transfer made between customers and the bank.

== Locations ==
Notes: The community trial launch date denominates a public trial of the Mondex scheme in that country, not the internal company trials that began prior. The commercial and trial shutdown dates indicate the point where fund withdrawals from the cards were disabled.

Country name	Initial franchise partners	Franchise deal signing date	Community trial launch date	Community trial shutdown date	Commercial launch date	Commercial shutdown date	Launched card types (not including Mondex purse)
Africa
Ghana	Agricultural Development Bank and Ghana Commercial Bank	November 1998			April 2003		
America
Canada	Royal Bank of Canada and Canadian Imperial Bank of Commerce	May 1995	Guelph trial: February 1997 Sherbrooke trial: August 1999	Guelph trial: December 1998 Sherbrooke trial: October 2001		June 2002	Combo student ID/library card
Chile	Banco de A.Edwards, Banco de Chile, Banco de Credito e Inversiones, Banco Santiago, Banco Sud Americano and Banco Santander	October 1998	No implementation is known to have been launched				
Costa Rica	Credomatic	June 1997			June 1998		Credit card
Mexico	Banco Nacional de México, Bancomer and Banco Internacional	November 1999	March 2001				
United States	AT&T, Chase Manhattan, Dean Witter Discover, First Chicago NBD, Mastercard, Michigan National Bank and Wells Fargo Bank	December 1996	Upper West Side trial: October 1997	Upper West Side trial: December 1998	Full implementation never occurred		
Uruguay	Banco de la Republica Oriental del Uruguay and Banco de Montevideo	April 1998	No implementation is known to have been launched				
Venezuela	Banco Mercantil, Banco Unión, Consorcio Credicard, InterBank and Banesco Banco Universal	August 2000					Combo student ID/access control
Asia
Hong Kong	Hongkong Bank	October 1994	October 1996		November 1997	April 2002	Student ID
Israel	Discount Investment Corporation and Paz Oil Company	July 1997	June 1998				Student ID
Japan	Mastercard, Sanwa Bank and JCB	February 1999	Community trial doesn't seem to have occurred; Hitachi implemented an Employee ID trial in February 2000				Employee ID
Philippines	NextStage and Mondex Asia	October 2000	Shangri-La Plaza mall trial: March 2001 Governmental schools trial: July 2001		Q4 2002	End of 2005	
South Korea	Mastercard Korea, Kookmin Bank, Korea Credit Communication, Amdahl Corporation, KDB Capital and TeraSource Venture Capital	June 1999	October 1999		June 2000	April 2005	Combo transportation card/credit card, health service card, gift card, student ID, employee ID, loyalty card
Taiwan	Acer and Mondex Asia	November 2001	Community trial doesn't seem to have occurred; Acer implemented an internal employee cafeteria trial in November 1999		June 2002	May 2008	Credit card, lottery ticket card, student ID, loyalty card, taxi card, gift card
Europe
Ireland	National Irish Bank (via parent National Australia Bank) and Ulster Bank	April 1997			June 2000		Loyalty card
France	Crédit Mutuel	October 1998	October 1999	Shutdown date unknown; Mondex France closed down in November 2002			
Norway	Posten SDS	August 1998	June 2000		May 2002	Shutdown date unknown; Mondex Norway was merged with Buypass in 2008	Combo lottery card/credit card/electronic ID, student ID, combo employee ID/access control
United Kingdom	National Westminster Bank and Midland Bank	December 1993	NatWest internal employee trial: 1993 Swindon trial: July 1995	Swindon trial: July 1998	Full implementation never occurred		Combo student ID/library card/access control
Oceania
Australia	National Australia Bank, Westpac, Commonwealth Bank and Australia & New Zealand Banking Group	June 1996	Community trial doesn't seem to have occurred; Westpac Banking Corporation launched an internal trial in August 1997		Full implementation never occurred		
New Zealand	ANZ Banking Group (New Zealand), Bank of New Zealand, Countrywide Banking Corporation, the National Bank of New Zealand, ASB Bank and Westpac	June 1996	Community trial doesn't seem to have occurred; Westpac Banking Corporation launched an internal trial in October 1996		Full implementation never occurred		
