= Oyster card =

Payment method for public transport in London

- Location: London, England
- Launched: 30 June 2003
- Technology: Contactless smart card
- Operator: Indra Group
- Manager: Transport for London
- Currency: Pound sterling (£90 maximum load)
- Stored-value: Pay-as-you-go
- Credit expiry: None
- Auto recharge: Auto top-up
- Unlimited use: Travelcard
- Validity: London Buses; London Underground; Docklands Light Railway; London Overground; Elizabeth line (part); London Trams; London River Services (limited validity); London Cable Car; National Rail Services inside of the grey line on this map
- Retailed: Ticket machines; Online; Newsagents; Telephone
- Variants: Freedom Pass; Bus & Tram Discount; Visitor; Zip; OnePulse (discontinued)
- Website: oyster.tfl.gov.uk

The Oyster card is a payment method for public transport in London and some surrounding areas. A standard Oyster card is a blue credit-card-sized stored-value contactless smart card. It is operated by Transport for London (TfL) and can be used as part of London's integrated transport network on travel modes including London Buses, London Underground, the Docklands Light Railway (DLR), London Overground, Tramlink, some river boat services, and most National Rail services within the London fare zones. Since its introduction in June 2003, more than 86 million cards have been used.

Oyster cards can hold period tickets, travel permits and, most commonly, credit for travel (pay as you go, or PAYG), which must be added to the card before travel. Passengers touch the card on an electronic reader when entering the system, and in some cases when leaving it; the reader validates the card and, when relevant, deducts the fare from the stored credit. Cards can be topped up by continuous payment authority, by online purchase, at credit card terminals or by cash; the latter two methods are available at stations and convenience stores. The card is designed to reduce the number of transactions at ticket offices and the number of paper tickets. Cash payment has not been accepted on London buses since 2014.

The card was first issued to the public on 30 June 2003, with a limited range of features; further functions were rolled out over time. By June 2012, over 43 million Oyster cards had been issued and more than 80% of all journeys on public transport in London were made using the card.

From September 2007 to 2010, the Oyster card functionality was tried as an experiment on Barclaycard contactless credit cards. Since 2014, the use of Oyster cards has been supplemented by contactless credit and debit cards as part of TfL's "Future Ticketing Programme". TfL was one of the first public transport operators in the world to accept payment by contactless credit cards (after the tramways and buses of Nice, which began accepting NFC bank cards and smartphones on 21 May 2010). The widespread adoption of contactless payment in London has been credited to this. By 2016, TfL was one of Europe's largest contactless merchants, with around 1 in 10 UK contactless transactions taking place on its network.

== Background ==
=== Precursor ===
Early electronic smartcard ticket technology was developed in the 1980s and first tested by London Transport on bus route 212 from Chingford to Walthamstow in 1992. The trial demonstrated that the technology was feasible and that it would reduce boarding times. These results were then replicated on a larger scale in February 1994 when the "Smart Photocard" was launched and tested in Harrow on 200 buses running on 21 routes. Advertised as "the new passport to Harrow's buses", the £2 million trial was the largest of its kind in the world, and nearly 18,000 photocards were issued to Harrow residents. It ran until December 1995 and was also determined to be a success: it reduced boarding times, was easy to use, and could record entry and exit stops and calculate the fare, the basis for pay as you go, which was introduced in February 1995.

However, Seoul's Upass smartcard was the first to implement this technology on a wide scale, from late 1995, eight years before London introduced Oyster. In the UK, the first smartcard issued to the public was Nottingham's BusCard, in 2000.

=== Operator ===
The Oyster card was set up under a Private Finance Initiative (PFI) contract between Transport for London (TfL) and TranSys, a consortium of suppliers that included Electronic Data Systems (EDS), Cubic Transportation Systems (responsible for day-to-day management), Fujitsu, and WS Atkins (shareholders with no active involvement). The £100 million contract was signed in 1998 for a term of 17 years until 2015 at a total cost of £1.1 billion.

In August 2008, following a number of technical failures, TfL decided to exercise a break option in the contract to terminate it in 2010, five years early. However, TfL said the break was intended to reduce costs and was not connected to the system failures. In November 2008, TfL announced a new contract with Cubic and EDS, two of the original consortium members, to run the system from 2010 to 2013.

In 2026, the Indra Group took over from Cubic under a seven-year contract with options to extend.

=== Brand ===
The Oyster name was chosen after a lengthy research process managed by TranSys and approved by TfL. Two other names were considered, "Pulse" and "Gem", but "Oyster" was chosen because it was a fresh approach that was not directly linked to transport, ticketing or London. According to Andrew McCrum, of the brand naming consultancy Appella, who was brought in to find a name by Saatchi and Saatchi Design (contracted by TranSys), "Oyster was conceived, mainly, because of the metaphorical implications of security and value in the hard bivalve shell and the concealed pearl. Its associations with London through Thames estuary oyster beds and the major relevance of the popular idiom 'the world is your oyster' were also significant factors in its selection".

The intellectual property rights to the Oyster brand originally belonged to TranSys. Following the renegotiation of the operating contract in 2008, TfL sought to retain the right to use the brand after its partnership with TranSys ended, and bought the rights in 2010 for £1 million.

=== Technology ===
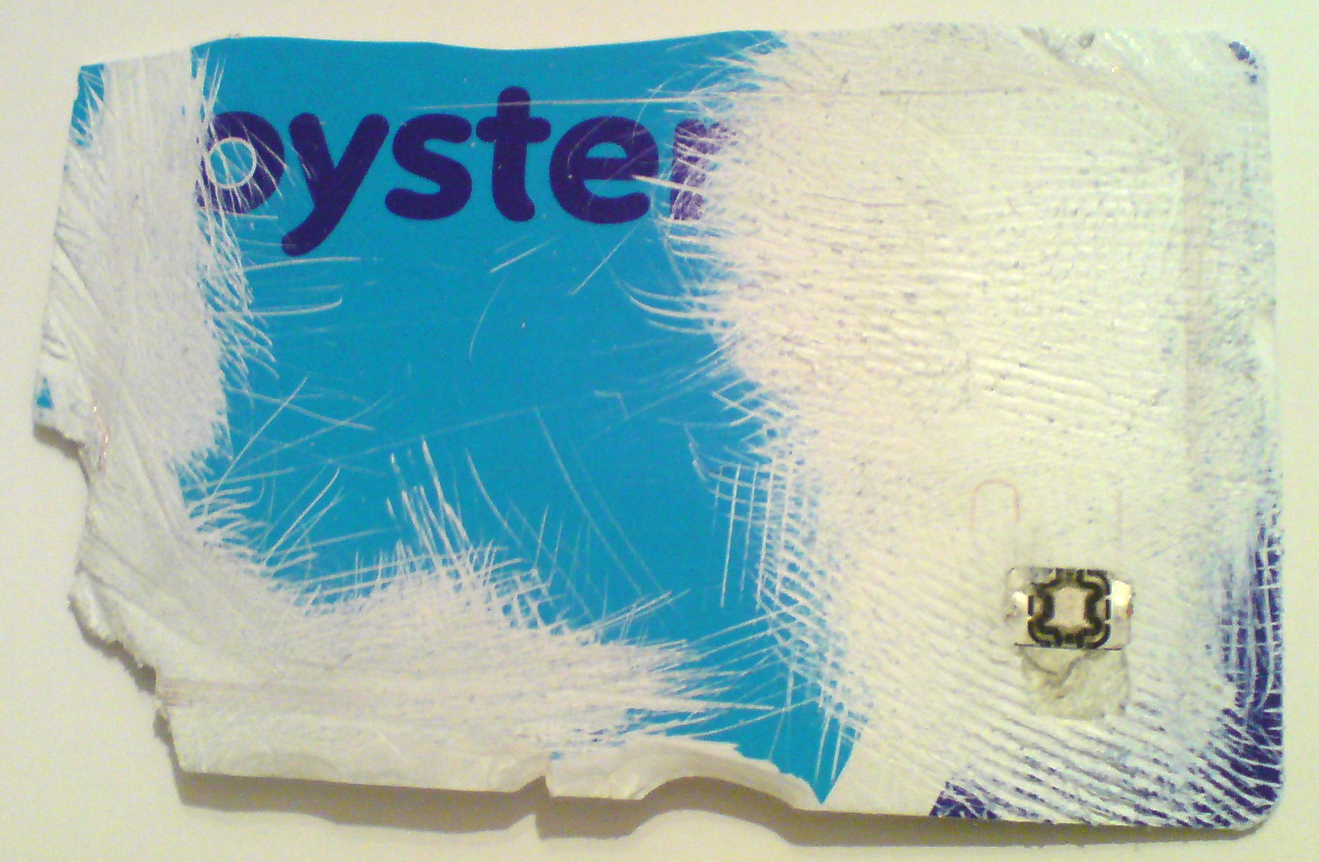
A damaged Oyster card, revealing the microchip in the lower right corner and the antenna running around the perimeter of the card

The Oyster card has a claimed proximity range of about 80 mm (3.1 inches). The card operates as an RFID system and is compatible with ISO/IEC 14443 types A and B. Oyster readers can also read other types of cards including Cubic Transportation Systems' Go cards. From its inception until January 2010, Oyster cards were based on NXP/Philips' MIFARE Classic 1k chips provided by Giesecke & Devrient, Gemalto, and SchlumbergerSema. All new Oyster cards have used MIFARE DESFire EV1 chips since December 2009. From 2010, MIFARE Classic-based Oyster cards were no longer issued. MIFARE DESFire cards are now widely used as transport smartcards.

In 2008, a fashion caught on for removing the RFID chip from Oyster cards and attaching it to wristwatches and bracelets. This allowed commuters to pass through the gates by "swiping" their hand without the need to take out a proper card. Although the RFID chips were charged in the normal way and no fare evasion was involved, TfL disapproved of the practice and threatened to fine anyone not carrying a full undamaged card, although it is not clear what the actual offence would be, were a case to be brought.

=== Architecture ===
The Oyster system is based on a closed, proprietary architecture from Cubic Transportation Systems. The card readers were developed entirely by Cubic, whereas development of the back office systems was started by Fujitsu and completed by Cubic. The system has the capability to interface with equipment or services provided by other suppliers. The Oyster website is not part of the closed system but interfaces with it. Similarly, Oyster readers are now embedded into ticket machines produced by Shere and Scheidt & Bachmann on the National Rail network.

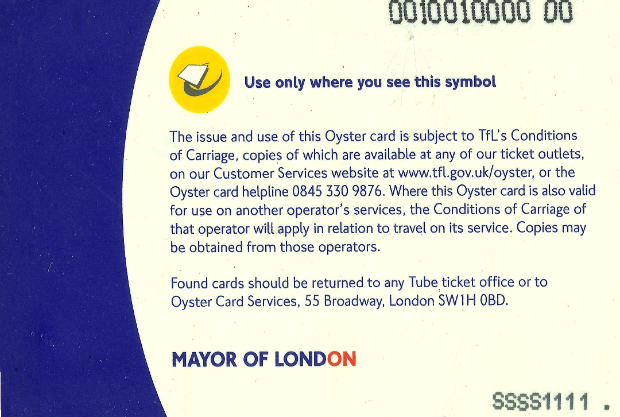
The back of a first-generation Oyster card

In early 2007, TfL and Deloitte worked to migrate the on-line payment systems to a more open architecture, using a number of open source components such as Linux, to resolve issues of lock-in costs, updates, incorporation of new security standards of PCI DSS, non-scalability, low and inconsistent quality of service, and slower response time to business changes.

== Features ==
=== Registration and protection ===
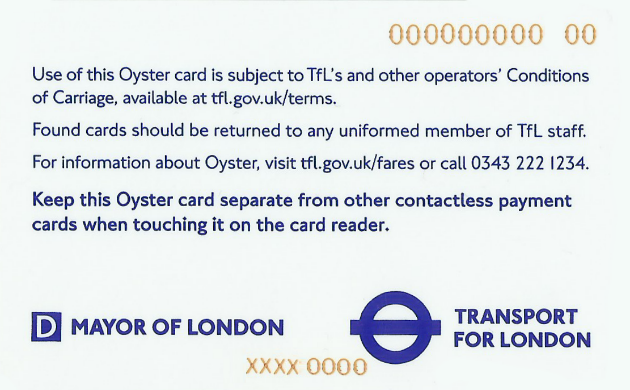
The back of a second-generation card

Oyster cards can be registered, which protects them against loss or theft. Registration is needed to buy monthly or longer Travelcards and Bus & Tram Passes. As of 2013, it could be done online or with a form available from an Oyster Ticket Stop, a Tube or London Overground station, selected National Rail stations or a Travel Information Centre.

=== Sales ===
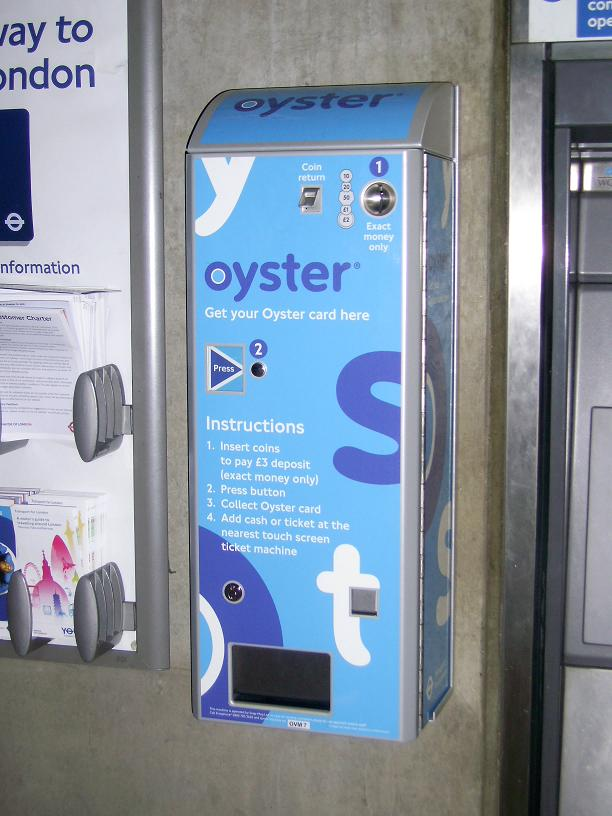
Oyster card vending machine, installed at London Bridge station in December 2006. All machines of this design have been phased out.

Oyster cards can be purchased from a number of different outlets in the London area:

- Ticket machines at London Underground stations, which accept banknotes, coins, and credit and debit cards.
- London Overground & Elizabeth Line ticket offices
- Online, using the TfL website
- Through the TfL app
- Selected National Rail stations, some of which are also served by London Underground
- Travel Information Centres
- About 4,000 Oyster Ticket Stop agents (usually newsagent's shops)
- By telephone sales from TfL.

Visitor Oyster cards can be obtained from Visit Britain outlets around the world, and from other transport operators, such as EasyJet and Gatwick Express, online, and from any ticket office. However, these limited-functionality cards cannot be registered. Any remaining credit on the card is refundable upon return of the card; the £5 price of the card is not refunded.

Oyster cards were initially free, but a refundable deposit of £3 was subsequently introduced in May 2009, then increased to £5 in January 2011. Deposits and unused credit may be refunded by posting the card to TfL; refunds are available by cheque in pounds sterling, by bank transfer to a UK account, as credit to another Oyster card, or as a TfL web account voucher. Customers must provide proof of identity and address for refunds exceeding £15. Refunds of up to £10, including the deposit, can alternatively be claimed in cash at London Underground ticket machines. Although the £5 deposit was intended to cover the cost of the card itself, ticket machines have no facility to retain the card, so customers completing a refund transaction remain in possession of a deactivated Oyster card. For cards issued since February 2020, the £5 deposit was replaced by a card fee, which is credited to the card after the first transaction made more than a year after issue. On 4 September 2022, the card fee increased to £7 and became non-refundable. In July 2025, it was reported that the fee would rise to £10 that September. The fee rose by 50p to £10.50 on 1 March 2026.

Unregistered cards can only be loaded with credit to use at adult pay-as-you-go rates, and adult 7-day Travelcards.

Ticket vending machines on most National Rail stations will top up Oyster cards and sell tickets that can be loaded onto Oyster. New Oyster cards are not available at most National Rail stations. At several main line termini, TfL runs Travel Information Centres, which do sell Oyster cards.

=== Reporting ===
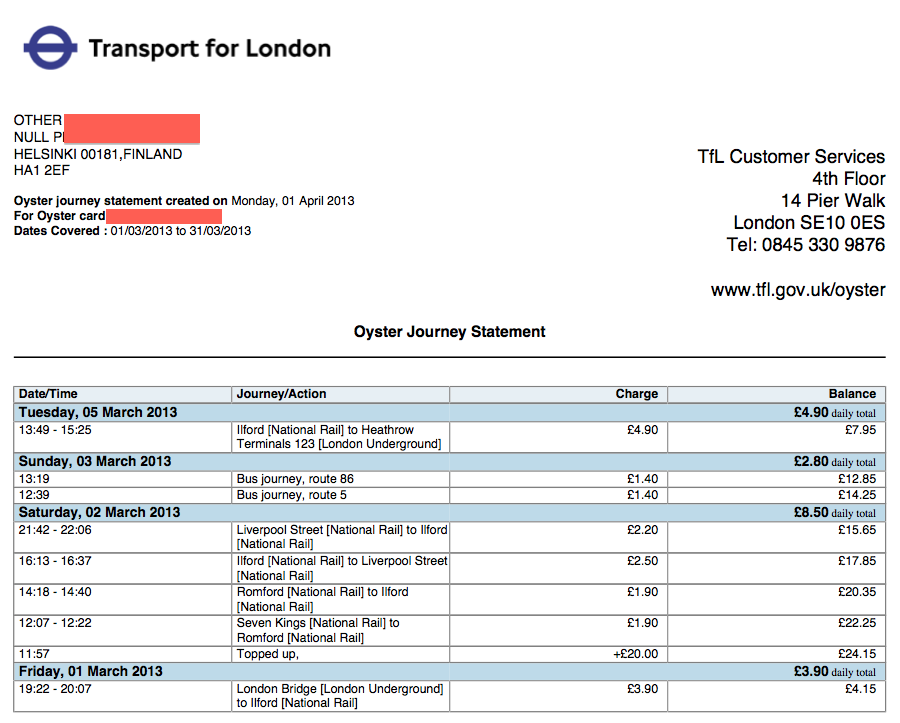
Oyster Travel Statement

Touch-screen ticket machines display the last eight journeys and most recent top-up amount. The balance is displayed on some Underground barriers at the end of journeys that have caused a debit from the balance, and can also be checked at newsagents and National Rail stations that provide a top-up facility.

== Use ==
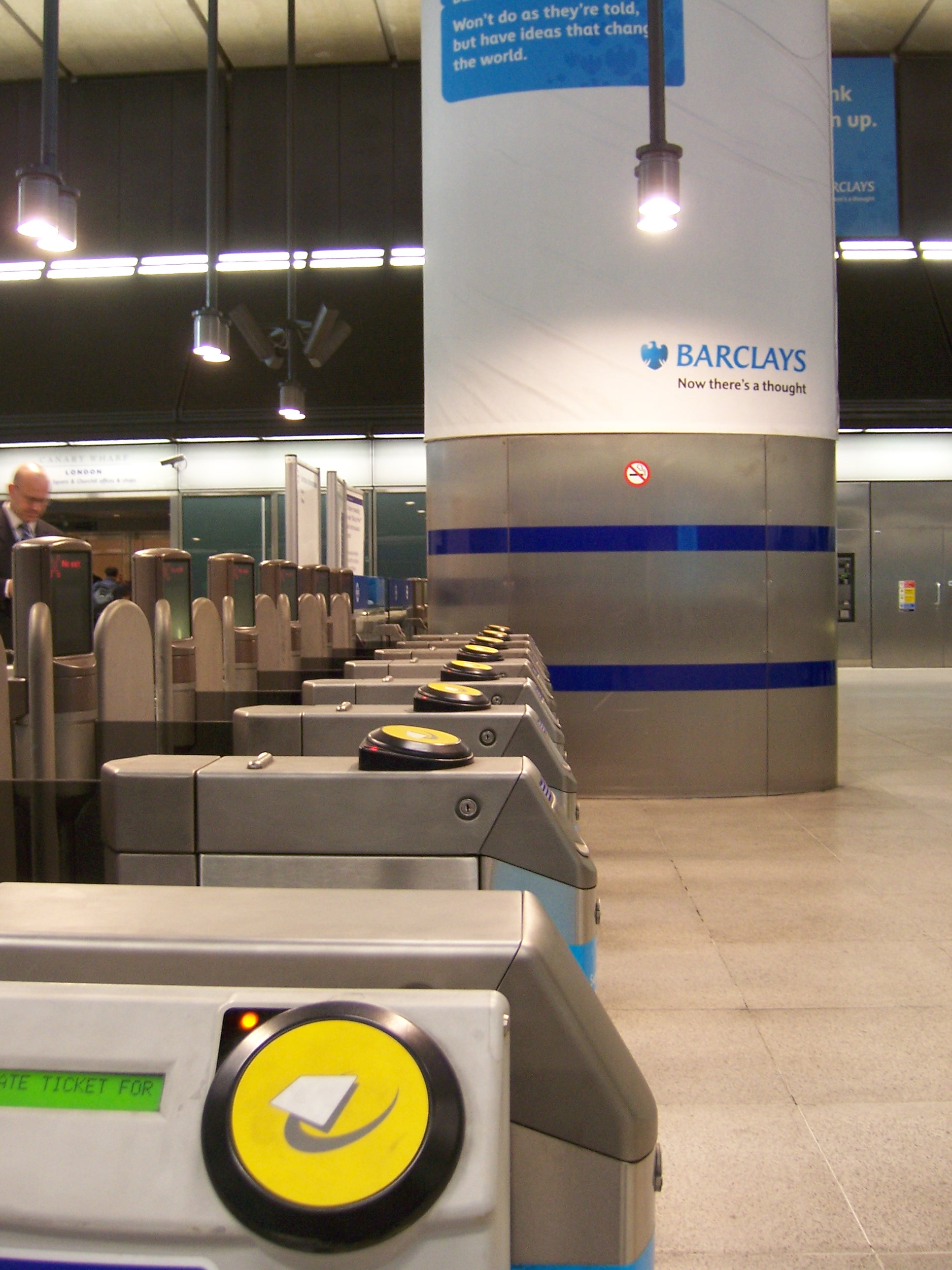
Oyster card readers on London Underground ticket barriers at Canary Wharf

=== Touching in and out ===
While using an Oyster card on most journeys, the user taps the reader with the card at the beginning and end of the journey. This includes the London Underground, Overground, Elizabeth line, and DLR services.

Physical contact is not necessary, but the range of the reader is only a few millimetres. There are two types of reader: pink and yellow.

On tram and bus journeys, passengers need to tap the reader at the start of their journey. The exception is tram journeys to Wimbledon station, where trams arrive within the ticket gates; a touch-out is therefore necessary to leave the station.

=== Season tickets ===
Oyster cards can store bus passes of one week or more and a pay-as-you-go balance. They may also be used to store season tickets for Travelcards.

An Oyster card can hold up to three season tickets simultaneously. Season tickets are Bus & Tram Passes or Travelcards lasting seven days, one month, or any duration up to one year.

Travelcards are valid on all Underground, Overground, DLR, bus, tram and National Rail services within the zones purchased. Tube, DLR and London Overground Travelcards may be used on buses in all zones. Trams may also be used if the Travelcard includes zones 3, 4, 5 or 6.

Although TfL asks all Oyster users to tap their card at entry/exit points of their journey, in practice Travelcard holders only need to "touch in" and "touch out" to operate ticket barriers or because they intend to travel outside the zones for which their Travelcard is valid. As long as the Travelcard holder stays within their permitted zones, no fare will be deducted from the pay-as-you-go funds on the card. The Oyster system checks that the Travelcard is valid in the zones it is being used in.

==== Travel outside zones ====
If users travel outside the valid zones of their Travelcard (but within Oyster payment zones), any remaining fare due may be deducted from their pay-as-you-go funds. From 22 May 2011, Oyster Extension Permits (OEPs) were no longer required. Before that date, users who travelled outside the zones of their Travelcard, and whose journey involved the use of a National Rail service, were required to set an OEP on their Oyster card before travelling, to ensure that they paid for the extra-zonal journey.

==== Renewals ====
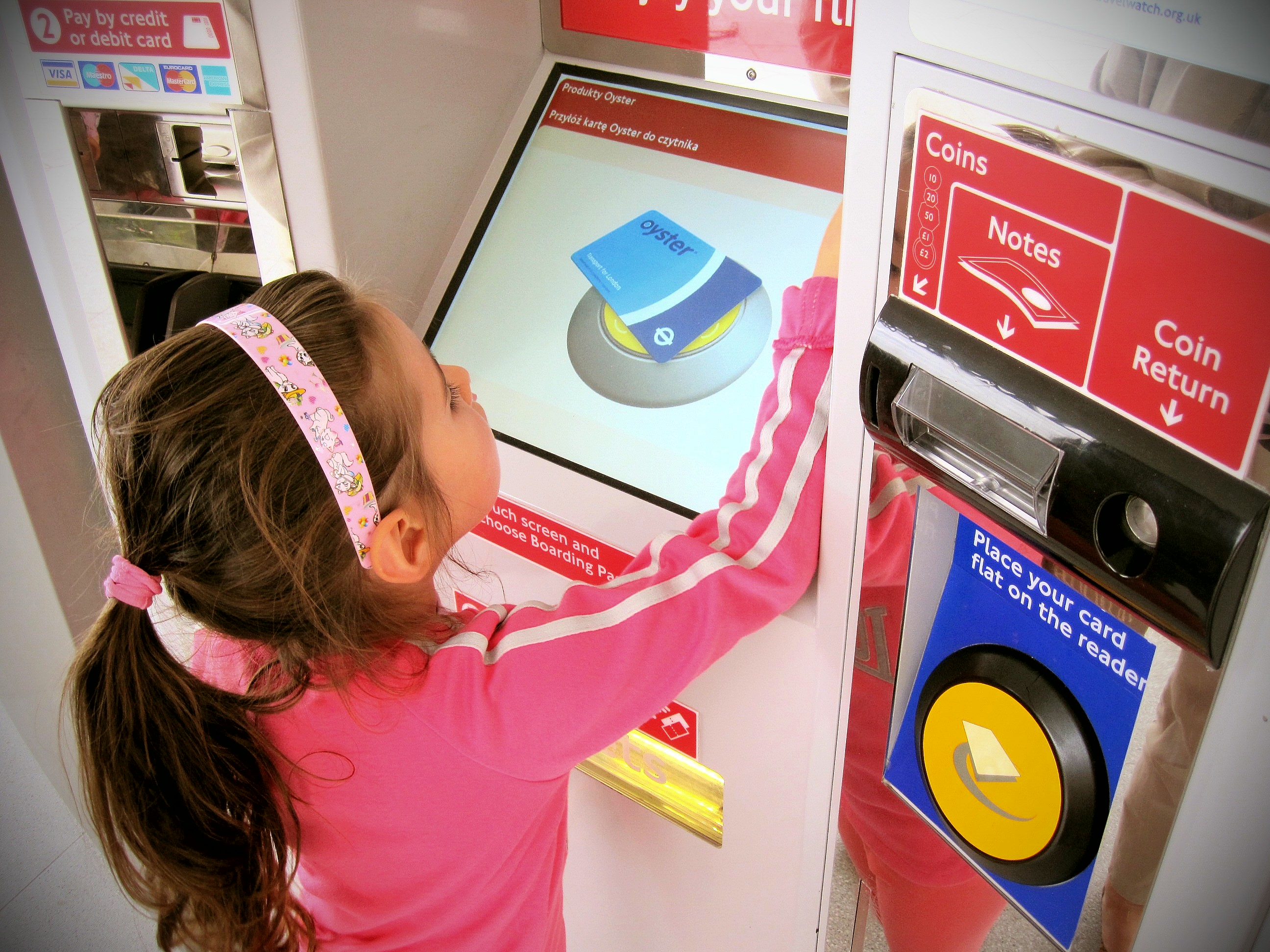
Oyster card top-up machine at IFS Cloud Royal Docks

Oyster card Travelcards can be renewed at the normal sales points and ticket machines at London Underground or London Overground stations, Oyster Ticket Stop agents, or some National Rail stations. Travelcards can also be renewed online via the Oystercard website, or by telephone sales from TfL. Alternatively a user can choose to automatically add £10, £20, or £40 every time the balance on the card falls below £20, with payment charged to a registered credit or debit card. Online purchases can be collected at any Oyster touch point (including buses, but not including ticket machines) 30 minutes after purchase; the previous requirement to nominate a station at which to collect the top-up and wait until the next day has been removed. The touch will start (or, as applicable, end) a journey in the normal way, and may result in a charge to the card.

=== Pay-as-you-go ===
In addition to holding Travelcards and bus passes, Oyster cards can also be used as stored-value cards, holding electronic funds. Amounts are deducted from the card each time it is used, and the funds can be "recharged" when required. The maximum value that an Oyster card may hold is £90. This system is known as "pay as you go" (abbreviated PAYG), because instead of holding a season ticket, the user only pays at the point of use. Oyster PAYG has now been implemented across National Rail services in the London Travelcard area (Zones 1–9), some additional stations served by c2c, Elizabeth line (not West Drayton to Reading), Govia Thameslink Railway, Greater Anglia, London Overground, Southeastern high-speed services within London, as well as Gatwick Express and Heathrow Express.

In May 2006, TfL and the Department for Transport agreed a £20 million funding package for train operators to install the equipment necessary to accept PAYG at all London stations. The package was not taken up by any train operating companies, and in September 2006, the South West Trains franchise was renewed by the Department for Transport with the condition that smartcard ticketing must be in place by 2009. In November 2007, the metro routes operated by Silverlink were brought under the control of TfL and operated under the brand name London Overground, accepting Oyster PAYG.

A necessary precursor of the acceptance of Oyster PAYG was the introduction of zonal single fares on the National Rail network in London; this was implemented in January 2007. Also in January, the then Mayor of London Ken Livingstone announced that he required operators to sign up by 31 January 2007 in order to receive the funding package offer. c2c and Chiltern Railways accepted the deal and on 31 January 2007, a commitment was made by ATOC, in principle, that all other operators would eventually accept the PAYG product. According to ATOC, roll-out plans were subject to the installation of suitable ticket gates and back office equipment at all 330 stations. It was expected that by February 2009 TfL would announce plans for all suburban trains to accept the card. In May 2009 London TravelWatch indicated it had discovered that the works were unlikely to be completed until 2010. On 23 November 2009 the Greater London Authority announced that from 2 January 2010 the vast majority of rail services in Greater London would accept Oyster PAYG.

When Oyster cards were introduced, the PAYG system was initially named "pre pay".

The validity of PAYG has a more complex history, as it has only been gradually accepted by transport operators independent of TfL. Additionally, the use of PAYG differs across the various modes of transport in London, and passengers are sometimes required to follow different procedures to pay for their journey correctly.

It is possible to have a negative pay-as-you-go balance after completing a journey, but this will prevent the card from being used (even if it is loaded with a valid Travelcard) until the card is topped up.

==== Oyster route validators ====
In 2009, TfL introduced a new type of Oyster card validator, distinguished from the standard yellow validators by having a pink-coloured reader. They do not deduct funds, but are used at peripheral interchange points to confirm journey details.

==== Underground, Overground, Elizabeth line, National Rail and DLR ====
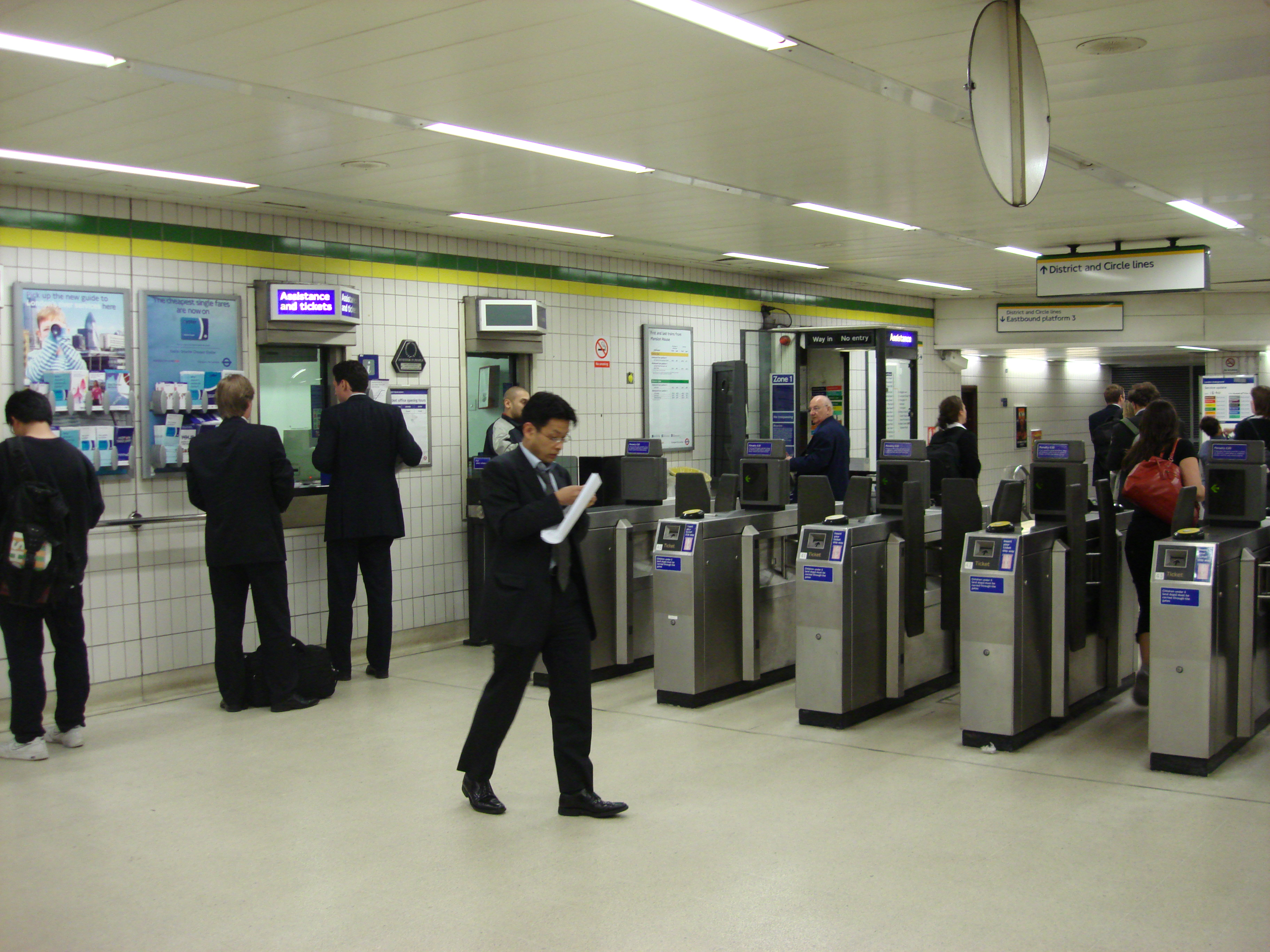
London Underground ticket barriers with yellow Oyster readers

Oyster card pay-as-you-go users must "touch in" at the start of a journey by London Underground, London Overground, Elizabeth line, National Rail or DLR, and "touch out" again at the end. The Oyster card readers automatically calculate the correct fare based on the start and end points of the journey and deduct that fare from the Oyster card. Pay-as-you-go funds are also used to cover any additional fares due from season ticket holders who have travelled outside the valid zones of their season ticket (see Travelcards). All these services belong to the same network; users should only touch in once at the beginning of the journey and touch out once at the end of the journey, regardless of the number of changes between Underground, Overground, Elizabeth line, National Rail or DLR trains, unless the change of trains requires the user to leave the station and re-enter the system.

Passengers enter or exit most London Underground stations through ticket barriers which are operated by scanning an Oyster card or inserting a valid ticket. Some Tube stations (such as those at National Rail interchanges) and DLR stations have standalone validators with no barriers. In both instances, pay-as-you-go users are required to touch in and out.

==== Buses ====
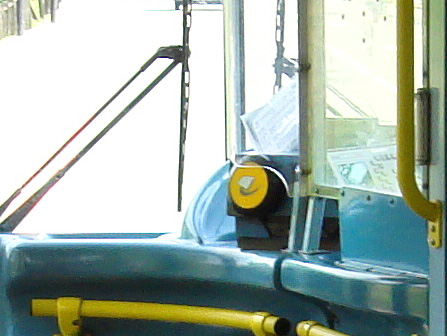
Oyster validators are placed at entrances on London buses.

Users must touch the Oyster card only once at the point of boarding; given that London buses have a flat fare of £1.85 (which allows for unlimited bus and tram journeys started within 62 minutes from the point of touching in), there is no need to calculate an end point of the journey.

Cash payment has not been accepted on London buses since 6 July 2014, with TfL heavily promoting the use of a contactless card or Oyster card. All major cards which carry the "contactless symbol" are accepted, as is payment by mobile phone app. As London buses do not accept cash payments, TfL introduced a "one more journey" incentive on Oyster cards allowing passengers to take a bus if their cards do not have enough credit to pay for a journey (but not a negative balance). This may lead to a negative balance until the card is topped up later. When using the 'one more journey' feature, customers receive an emergency fare advice slip to acknowledge that the Oyster 'One More Journey' feature has been used and to remind them that their card needs to be topped up before another journey can be made. It was estimated in 2014 that by eliminating cash from buses, TfL would save £103m by the year 2023, to be reinvested into the capital.

Some London bus routes cross outside the Greater London boundary before reaching their terminus. Pay-as-you-go users are permitted to travel the full length of these routes on buses operated as part of the London Bus network, even to destinations some distance outside Greater London.

==== Trams ====
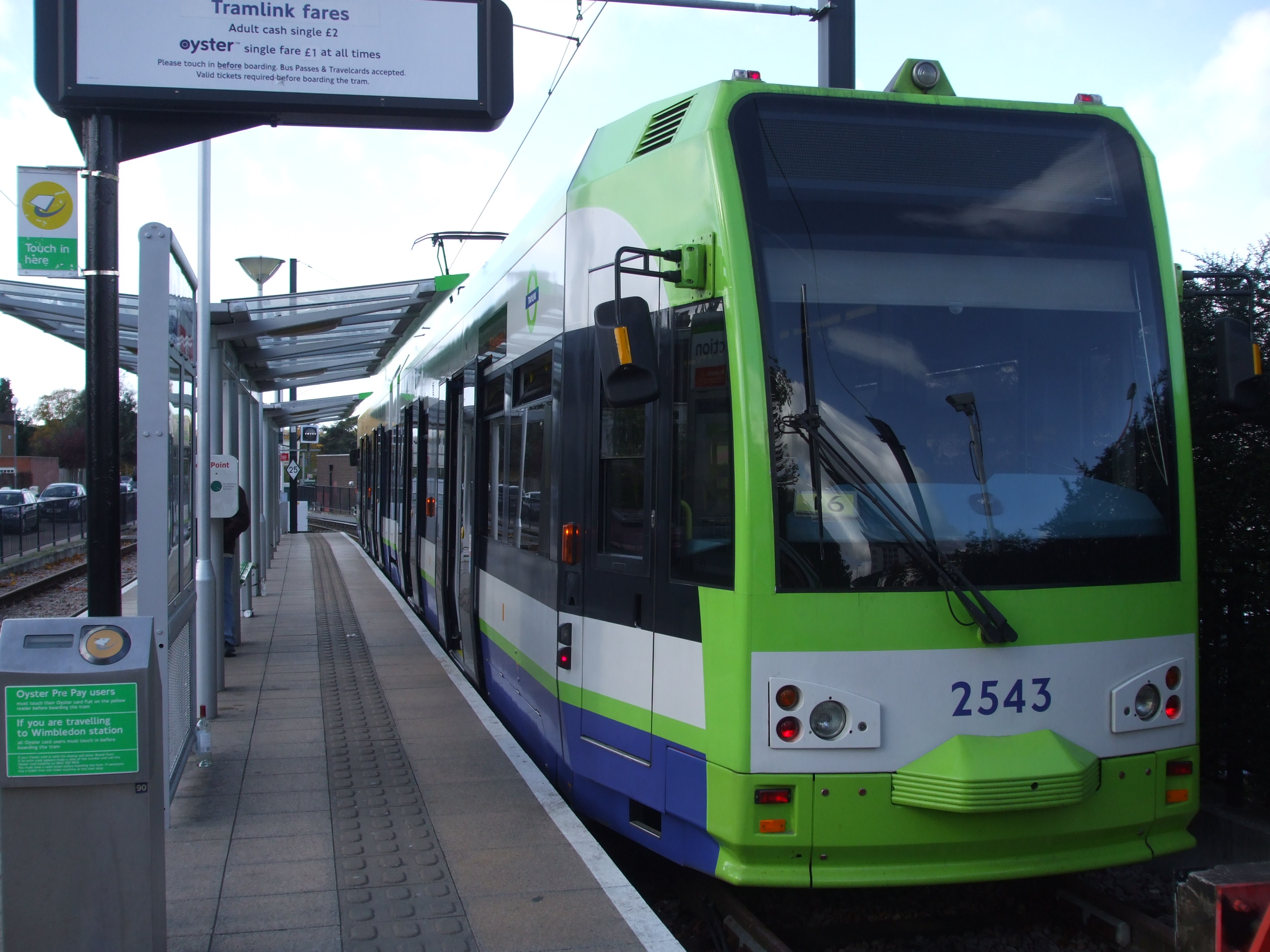
An Oyster validator at a tram stop

London's trams operate on the same fare structure as buses; the rules are similar, and users with pay-as-you-go must touch the Oyster card only once at the point of boarding. Transfers between trams and buses are free within 62 minutes (publicly stated as "one hour") of the first touch-in. Passengers should not touch out at the end of the journey—although in practice, no charge is usually made to cards should this happen, for it would come under the free transfer. Users with Travelcards valid for the Tramlink zones need not touch in unless travelling to Wimbledon with a Travelcard not valid in zone 3.

A more complex arrangement exists at Wimbledon station; tram passengers starting their journey there must pass through ticket gates in order to reach the tram platform, and therefore need to touch their Oyster card to open the barriers. They must then touch their Oyster card once again on the card reader on the Tramlink platform to confirm their journey as a tram passenger. Tram passengers arriving in Wimbledon must not touch out on the card reader on the Tramlink platform, but must touch out to exit via the station gates. If the card is touched on the platform, the touch-out at the gate would be seen as a touch-in and cause the maximum fare to be charged to the card.

==== River ====
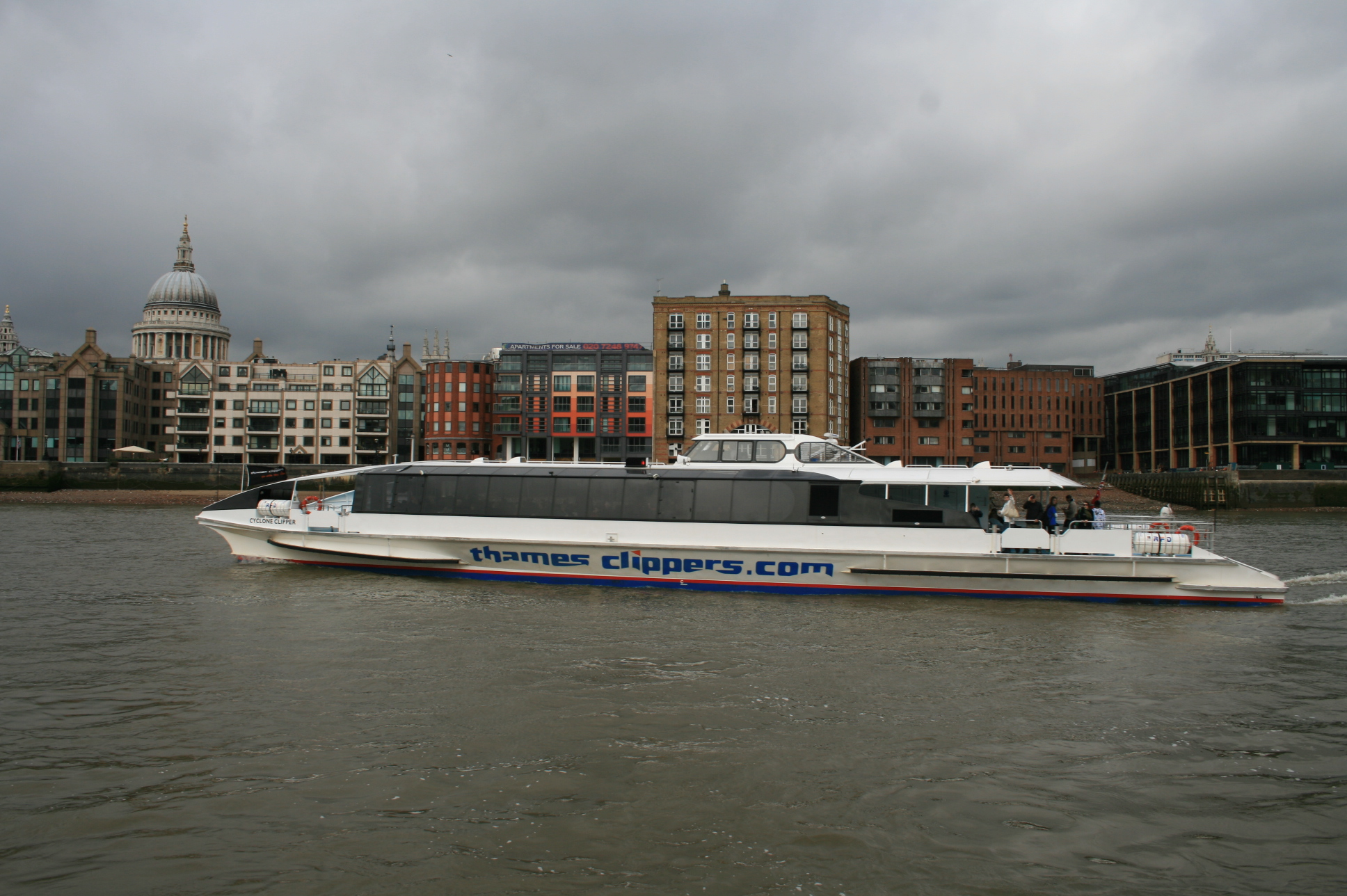
A Thames Clipper river bus service

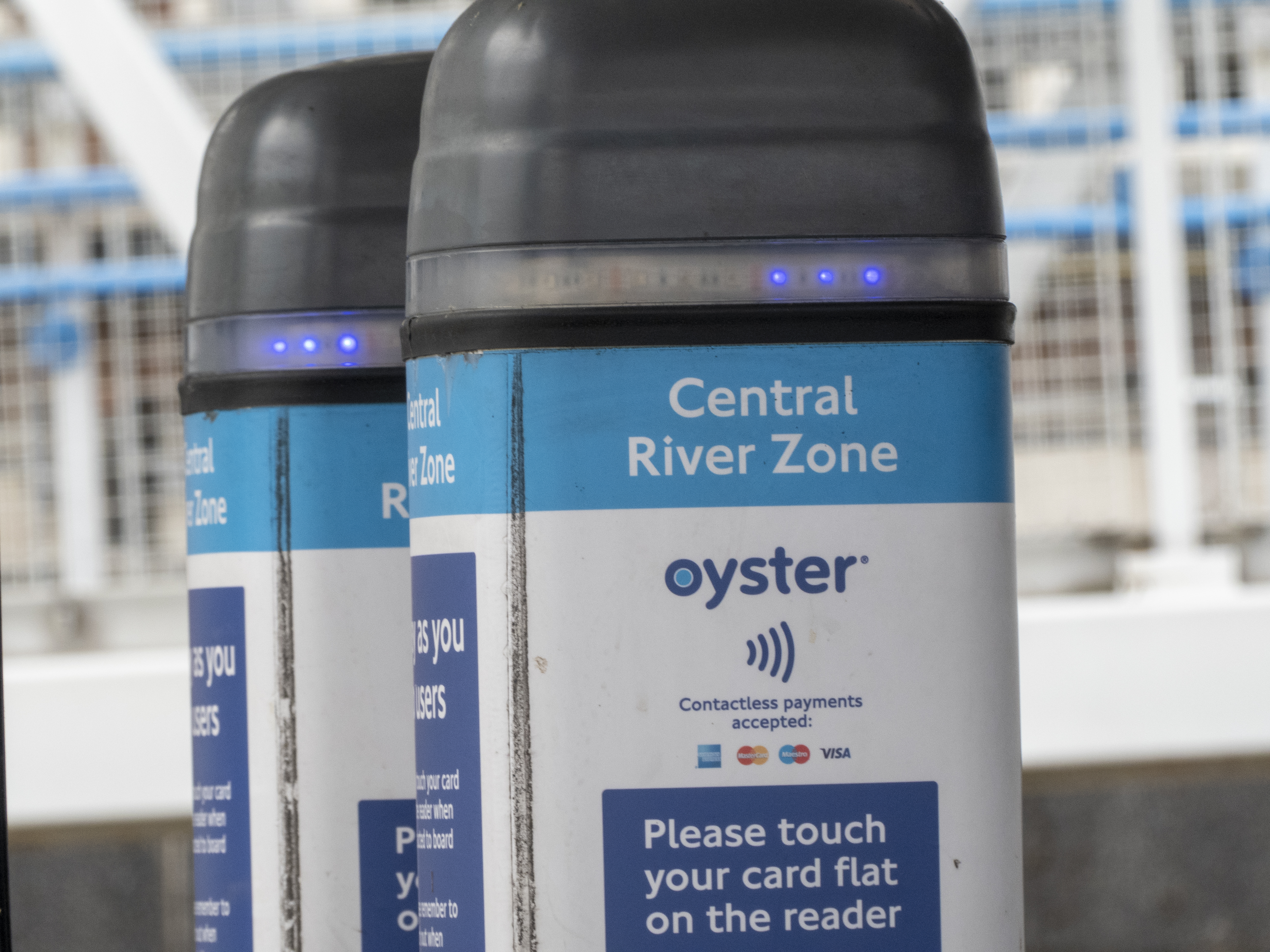
An Oyster card reader at a riverbus pier

Passengers boarding a Thames Clippers riverbus service must tap their Oyster card on the reader situated on the pier before boarding. Thames Clippers operates a pay-before-boarding policy.

==== London cable car ====
Oyster cards are accepted on the London cable car route between Greenwich Peninsula and Royal Docks.

==== Out-of-station interchange ====
At a number of Tube, DLR, London Overground and National Rail stations which are close together, or where interchange requires passengers to pass through ticket barriers, an out-of-station interchange (OSI) is permitted. In such cases, the card holder touches out at one station (including at standalone readers) and then touches in again before starting the next leg of the journey. The PAYG fares are then combined and charged as a single journey.

Examples include transferring between the Jubilee line and the DLR at Canary Wharf where Oyster card holders must tap their card at the ticket barriers in the Tube station, and then touch in on the validator at the DLR station. Balham (National Rail) to/from Balham (Tube) is another OSI, as is Camden Town (Tube) to/from Camden Road (London Overground). Failure to touch in or out on the validators in these circumstances will incur a maximum fare. In some cases (e.g. at West Hampstead National Rail stations) the OSI replicates interchanges which have existed for several decades before the invention of the Oyster system but were generally used with season tickets rather than day tickets.

Out-of-station interchanges can be temporary or permanent. A temporary arrangement may exist between two stations at short notice (routinely during weekend work but also when an emergency closure occurs). The two journeys that result are charged as a single journey.

==== Recharging ====
Pay as you go credit and season tickets (Travelcards and Bus & Tram passes) on an Oyster card can be topped up at ticket machines within almost all TfL stations and most Oyster-accepted National Rail stations as well as at Oyster ticket stops and TfL Visitor Centres. Cards can also be topped up through the TfL Go app or an online Oyster and Contactless account or by calling the Oyster helpline. A maximum of £90 can be held on the card, and there is a £50 top-up limit via the Go app or online.

==== Automatic top-up ====
Customers can set up and manage automatic top-up online for their existing Oyster card. They register a debit or credit card, make a PAYG top-up purchase (minimum £10) and select either £10, £20 or £40 as the automatic top-up amount. Alternatively, a new Oyster card with Auto top-up and a minimum of £10 pay-as-you-go can be ordered via Oyster online.

=== Oyster photocards ===
Oyster photocards, with an image of the authorised user on the card front, are issued to members of groups eligible for free or discounted travel. The cards are encoded to offer discounted fares and are available for students in full-time education (30% off season tickets), 16+ cards (half the adult rate for single journeys on the Underground, London Overground, DLR and a limited number of National Rail services, discounted period Travelcards, free travel on buses and trams for students that live and attend full-time education in London) and for children under 16 years old (free travel on buses and trams and discounted single fares on the Underground, London Overground, DLR and most National Rail services). A Bus & Tram Discount Card is specifically given to disadvantaged and "unwaged" groups, primarily those on Jobseeker's Allowance, Employment and Support Allowance and recipients of a variety of disability allowances, at half-fare rates for bus and tram services only; these cards simply charge the full rate on journeys not included in the discount scheme.

==== Student cards ====
Student Oyster photocards offering a 30% discount on period tickets are available to full-time students over 18 at registered institutions within the area of the M25 motorway, an area slightly larger than Greater London, at a cost of £20. Until the 2009–10 academic year, they cost £5 but required replacing each year of multiple-year courses. There is no discount for pay-as-you-go, although many students hold the National Rail 16–25 Railcard, which can be added to an Oyster card at an Underground station ticket office to obtain a one-third reduction on off-peak caps and a one-third discount on off-peak Oyster single fares on all rail services. Peak National Rail fares may be cheaper with discounted paper tickets. A small selection of universities outside London have also registered on the scheme.

A replacement for lost or stolen cards costs £10 and involves applying for a replacement card online or by calling the Oyster helpline. A new photograph is not required. The funds and remaining Travelcard are transferable to a new student Oyster photocard.

Since 8 September 2006, students at some London universities have been able to apply for their 18+ Oyster photocard online by uploading a digital photograph and paying with a credit or debit card.

==== Zip cards ====
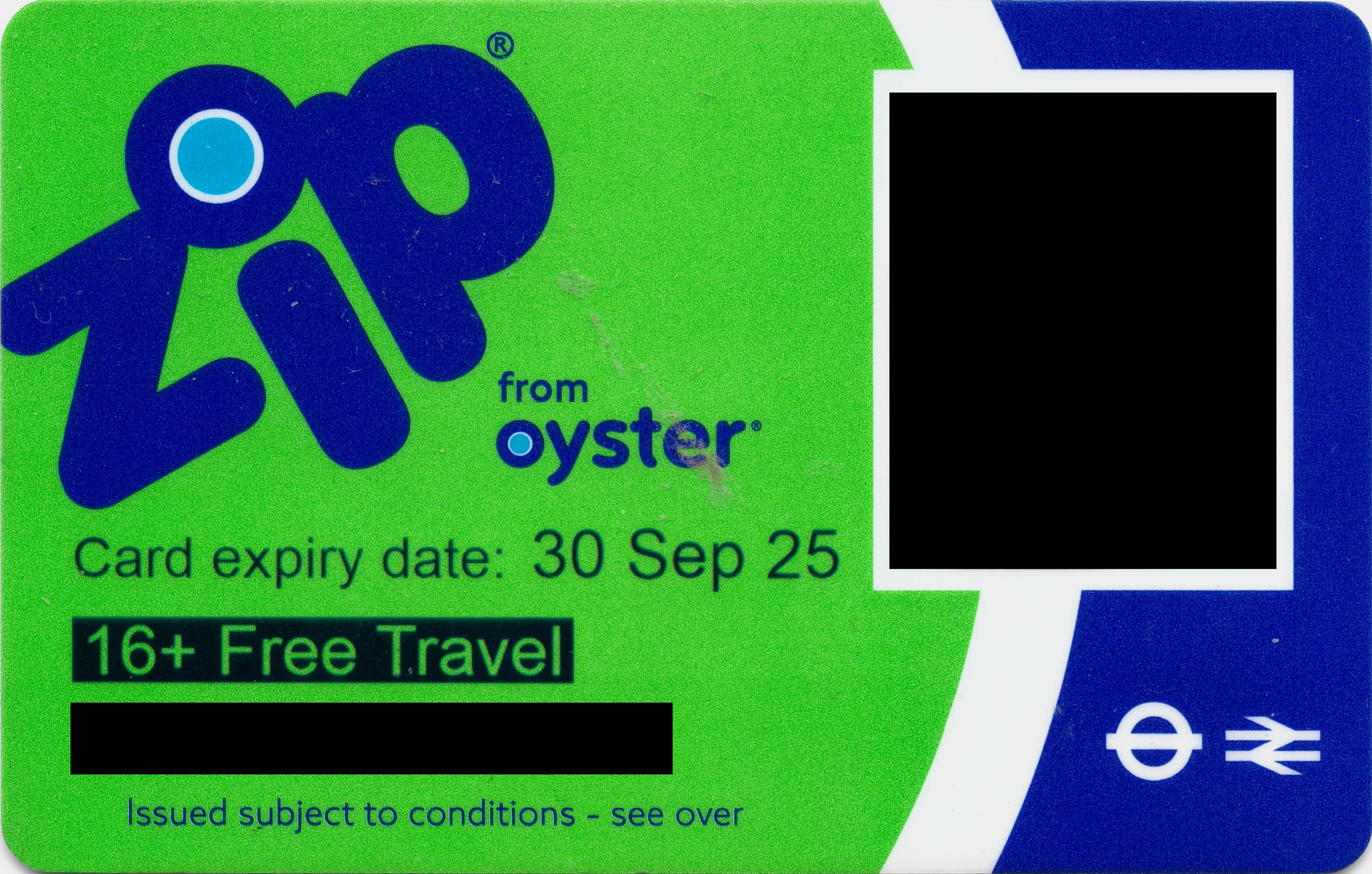
16+ Zip Oyster card

On 7 January 2008, Transport for London unveiled the Zip card, an Oyster photocard to be used by young people aged 18 years or under who qualify for free bus and tram travel within the capital, with effect from 1 June 2008. To qualify, one must live in a London borough (and still be in full-time education if 18 years old). Children outside London (and the UK) may also apply for a Visitor version of the Zip card (which offers free bus and tram travel for under-16s, and half-rate fares for 16–18-year-olds) online, which they must collect from one of TfL's Travel Information Centres. From 1 September 2010 a fee of £10–£15 (depending on age) has been charged for the card.

==== Freedom Passes and 60+ Oyster cards ====
Freedom Passes are generally issued on what is in technical terms an Oyster card, though it does not bear that name. Freedom Passes are free travel passes available to Greater London residents who are over 66 or with a disability specified in the Transport Act 2000; individual London boroughs have exceptional discretion to issue Freedom Passes to disabled people who do not meet the national statutory requirements (though they have to fund them). On weekdays, travel is free from 09:00 on the Tube, DLR, buses, Tramlink, and select National Rail services, and after 09:30 free travel is available on most National Rail journeys entirely within the London zones. On weekends and bank holidays, there are no time restrictions. Cards issued to people with a specified disability have no time restrictions. Holders cannot put any money or ticket products on a Freedom Pass; to travel outside these times, a separate Oyster card, ticket, or contactless payment card is required.

A Freedom Pass is also an English National Concessionary Bus Pass and provides travel on local buses throughout England. (Concessionary bus passes from other areas look the same as Freedom Passes, but are not additionally marked "Freedom Pass".) The 60+ Oyster card, however, is not valid for concessionary travel outside Greater London. This is because the concessionary bus travel scheme supported by the Freedom Pass is centrally funded by government and covers all of England, but the Oyster 60+ (and the Freedom Pass's validity on Tube, tram and rail networks) is funded by the Greater London Authority.

=== Oyster and credit card ===
The OnePulse card

A credit card variant of the Oyster card called OnePulse was launched by Barclaycard in September 2007, combining standard Oyster card functionality with Visa credit card facilities. It incorporated contactless payment technology, allowing most transactions up to £20 to be carried out without the need to enter a PIN (unlike the Chip and PIN system). The OnePulse card was withdrawn on 30 June 2014; existing cards were replaced by another credit card.

In 2005, Transport for London shortlisted two financial services suppliers, Barclaycard and American Express, to add e-money payment capability to the Oyster card. Barclaycard was selected in December 2006 to supply the card, but the project has since been shelved.

== Validity ==
A number of different ticket types can be held on an Oyster card, and validity varies across the different transport modes within London.

Mode	Travelcard	PAYG	Bus & Tram Pass
London Underground	Yes (Note: Subject to the zones covered by the Travelcard)	Yes	No
London Buses	Yes (Note: Regardless of the zones covered by the Travelcard)	Yes	Yes
London Trams	Yes (Note: The Travelcard must include Zone 3, 4, 5 or 6 – any of them provides validity across the whole tram network)	Yes	Yes
London Overground	Yes	Yes	No
Elizabeth line	yes but limited	yes but limited	No
National Rail	yes but limited	yes but limited	No
Heathrow Express	No	Yes (Note: PAYG is valid on Heathrow Express, Gatwick Express between London Victoria and Gatwick Airport and Southeastern High Speed services between London St Pancras and Stratford International, but special fares apply which don't count into any caps nor allow transferring between other National Rail services in a single journey. It is not valid on Southeastern High Speed into Ebbsfleet International and Ashford International, nor on Gatwick Express into Haywards Heath and Brighton.)	No
Southeastern high speed		yes but limited	
Gatwick Express		yes but limited	
London River Services	yes but limited	yes but limited	No
London Cable Car	No	Yes	No

- = Valid across the whole network.
- = Not valid.
- = Elizabeth line: Not valid between West Drayton and Reading.
- = National Rail: Only valid within the TfL fare zones, and selected stations outside London
- = River: PAYG only available on Thames Clipper; Travelcards only provide discount, not valid for travel.

=== TfL services ===
Oyster is operated by Transport for London and has been valid on all London Underground, London Buses, DLR and London Tramlink services since its launch on 30 June 2003, and on all London Overground services since their start of operation. However, Oyster is not accepted on Elizabeth line services past West Drayton (between Iver and Reading), due to TfL's fare system constraints requiring zonal allocation and these stations being outside Greater London. Services past West Drayton do accept contactless payment or any other valid ticket.

=== National Rail ===
The introduction of Oyster pay as you go on the National Rail commuter rail network in London was phased in gradually over a period of about six years (see Roll-out history). Since January 2010, PAYG has been valid on all London suburban rail services which accept Travelcards. Additionally, PAYG may be used at a selected number of stations which lie just outside the zones. New maps were issued in January 2010 which illustrate where PAYG is now valid.

Heathrow Express has accepted Oyster pay-as-you-go since 19 February 2019. In November 2007, the metro routes operated by Silverlink were brought under the control of TfL and operated under the brand name London Overground. From the first day of operation, Oyster PAYG became valid on all Overground routes.

=== London River Services ===
Since 23 November 2009, Oyster PAYG has been valid on London River Services boats operated by Thames Clippers only. Oyster cards are accepted for all Thames Clippers scheduled services, the DoubleTree Docklands ferry, the "Tate to Tate" service and the O2 Express. Discounts on standard fares are offered to Oyster cardholders, except on the O2 Express. The daily price capping guarantee does not apply to journeys made on Thames Clippers.

== Pricing ==
Pricing below is correct as of March 2023

The pricing system is fairly complex, and changes from time to time. The most up-to-date fares can be found on Transport for London's FareFinder website.

=== Adult single fares ===
Cash is no longer accepted on London's buses and trams and, in order to encourage passengers to use Oyster or contactless, cash fares for tubes and trains are generally much more expensive than PAYG fares. A contactless debit or credit card can be used in place of an Oyster card at the same fare.

=== Fare capping ===
A fare capping system was introduced on 27 February 2005, which means that an Oyster card will be charged no more than the nearest equivalent Day Travelcard for a day's travel, if penalty fares are not incurred. The daily cap is £8.90 within zones 1-2 and £16.30 within zones 1–6, provided no maximum fares are incurred for failure to touch in or out, or for touching in or out at the same station. A lower cap of £5.55 applies if the day's journeys are restricted to buses and trams only. Fare capping for the Oyster card was the first large-scale use of the technology.

There are 3 different caps in use: all-day cap (valid from 04:30 weekdays to 04:29 the next day on all rail, tram and bus services), off-peak cap (valid from 09:30 weekdays / 04:30 weekends to 04:29 the next day on all rail, tram and bus services) and bus & tram cap (valid from 04:30 to 04:29 the next day on buses and trams only). For both the all-day cap and off-peak cap, the respective zones travelled are recorded onto the card.

The Oyster system supports up to 15 zones. Stations which are not officially in zones 1-9 are allocated to the unpublicised zones, denoted A-E in hexadecimal (or 10-14 in denary), such as Watford Junction.

Price capping does not apply to PAYG fares on Heathrow Express, Gatwick Express, London River Services boats and on Southeastern high speed train services.

=== Travelcards ===
Season Travelcards within zones 1-9, Watford Junction, Hertford East / Broxbourne, and Shenfield can be loaded onto an Oyster card. For journeys totally within the zones covered by the Travelcard, no additional fare is deducted. However, if the default route is assumed to go through zone 1, and the Travelcard doesn't cover zone 1, the user must tell the system that zone 1 is avoided by touching a pink reader when changing trains using a route which doesn't pass through zone 1; otherwise an additional zone 1 fare is deducted. Because of how the system works, an Oyster Travelcard covering Hertford East / Broxbourne can also be used at Watford Junction, and an Oyster Travelcard covering Shenfield can also be used at Watford Junction, Hertford East and Broxbourne, as internally Watford Junction is in zone 10, Hertford East and Broxbourne are in zone 11 and Shenfield is in zone 12. This extra availability doesn't extend to paper Travelcards.

For journeys partially within the Travelcard coverage, an extension fare, corresponding to the extra zones used, is charged from the PAYG balance. If the PAYG balance is negative, the Oyster card can no longer be used for travel even within the zones covered until it is restored to zero or above by topping up.

=== Railcard discount ===
Holders of Disabled Persons, HM Forces, Senior, 16–25, 26–30, and Annual Gold Railcards receive a 1/3 discount on off-peak PAYG fares and the off-peak daily cap (Disabled Persons railcard includes the same discount for both peak and off-peak). Railcard discounts can be added at London Underground, some London Overground and some Elizabeth line station ticket machines with staff assistance.

=== Bus and tram discount ===
On 20 August 2007, a 'Bus and Tram Discount photocard' was launched for London Oyster card users who receive Income Support. As of December 2025, it allows cardholders to pay £0.85 for a single bus journey (capped at £2.55 per day), and to buy half-price bus passes (7 Day or Monthly, not available for Annual).

This was originally the result of a deal between Transport for London and Petróleos de Venezuela to provide fuel for London Buses at a 20% discount. In return, Transport for London agreed to open an office in the Venezuelan capital Caracas to offer expertise on town planning, tourism, public protection and environmental issues. The deal with Venezuela was ended by Mayor Boris Johnson shortly after he took office, and the Bus and Tram Discount photocard scheme closed to new applications on 20 August 2008; Johnson said that "TfL will honour the discount [on existing cards] until the six-month time periods on cards have run out".

The Bus and Tram Discount Scheme reopened on 2 January 2009, this time funded by London fare payers. The scheme has been extended to people receiving Employment and Support Allowance (ESA) and to those receiving Jobseeker's Allowance for 13 weeks or more.

=== River Bus discounts ===
Boats operated by Thames Clippers offer a 10% discount on standard fares to Oyster PAYG users, except on their O2 Express service, and a 1/3 discount to passengers carrying Oyster cards which have been loaded with a valid period Travelcard.

=== Minimum and maximum fare ===
To prevent "misuse" by a stated 2% of passengers, from 19 November 2006 pay-as-you-go users are automatically charged the "maximum Oyster fare" for a journey on that network when they touch in. Depending on the journey made, the difference between this maximum fare and the actual fare due is automatically refunded to the user's Oyster card upon touching out. The maximum fare is automatically charged to a passenger who touches out without having first touched in. The maximum Oyster fare applies even if the daily price cap has been reached as this does not count towards the cap. Two maximum fares are charged (one for touching in, one for touching out) if a passenger touches in at a station, waits for over 30 minutes, and then touches out at the same station, because the system assumes that the passenger has been able to travel to another station in that time, taking no account of situations where there are severe delays.

Users must touch in and out even if the ticket barriers are open. At stations without ticket barriers where Oyster is accepted, an Oyster validator is provided for touching in and out.

The system allows starting a journey if the balance of the card is at least the minimum fare from the station, which may be 0 if the card reaches a cap or if the station is within the zones covered by a Travelcard. However the maximum fare is deducted upon entry which may bring the balance to negative at this point.

Maximum Oyster fares may be contested by telephone to the Oyster helpline on 0343 222 1234 or via email. This involves providing the Oyster card number and the relevant journey details; further journeys appearing on the card are helpful to validate the user's claim.

If the claim is accepted then the maximum Oyster fare minus the cost of the journey will be refunded. This is credited to the card the next time it is used on a journey. The only way to collect a refund is as part of an actual journey; otherwise a further maximum fare is charged. This is because when the passenger touches the reader with their Oyster card, not only will the refund go on to the card, but a new journey will start.

Refunds become available to collect within 30 minutes. There is no longer a requirement to nominate a specific station from which to collect the refund.

Customers claiming a refund must do so within eight weeks of the journey.

Oyster users who do not touch in before making a journey may be liable to pay a penalty fare (£80) and/or be reported for prosecution if caught by a revenue protection inspector.

=== Refunds for delayed journeys ===
Commuters who were delayed 15 minutes or more on the Tube & DLR, and 30 minutes or more on London Overground & TfL Rail, are eligible to claim a refund for the cost of their journey. Commuters with Travelcards that do not pay for individual journeys will be refunded the Pay As You Go price of that single delayed journey. Customers wishing to claim these refunds must create an online TfL account, and then manually claim online each time they are delayed.

== Roll-out history ==
The roll-out of Oyster features and migration from the paper-based system has been phased. Milestones so far have been:

- London Underground ticket barriers, bus ticket machines, Docklands Light Railway stations and Tramlink stops fitted with validators. Cards issued to Transport for London, London Underground, and bus operator staff (2002)
- Cards issued to the public for annual and monthly tickets (2003)
- Freedom Passes issued on Oyster (2004)
- Pay as you go (PAYG, first called 'prepay') launched on London Underground, DLR, and the parts of National Rail where Underground fares had previously been valid. (January 2004)
- Off-Peak Oyster single fares launched (January 2004)
- Annual tickets available only on Oyster (2004)
- Monthly tickets available only on Oyster, unless purchased from a station operated by a train company rather than TfL (2004)
- PAYG on buses (May 2004)
- Daily price capping (February 2005)
- Student Oyster Photocards for students over 18 (early 2005)
- Oyster Child Photocards for under 16s—free travel on buses and reduced fares on trains (August 2005)
- Automatic top-up (September 2005)
- Weekly tickets available only on Oyster (September 2005)
- Oyster single fares cost up to 33% less than paper tickets (January 2006)
- Auto top-up on buses and trams (June 2006)
- Journey history for Pay as you go transactions available online (July 2006)
- Ability for active and retired railway staff who have a staff travel card to obtain privilege travel fares on the Underground with Oyster (July 2006)
- £4 or £5 'maximum cash fare' charged for Pay as you go journeys without a 'touch in' and 'touch out' (November 2006)
- Oyster card for visitors branded cards launched and sold by Gatwick Express.
- Oyster PAYG extended to London Overground (11 November 2007)
- Holders of Railcards (but not Network Railcard) can link their Railcard to Oyster to have PAYG capped at 34% below the normal rate since 2 January 2008.
- Oyster PAYG can be used to buy tickets on river services operated by Thames Clipper (23 November 2009)
- Oyster PAYG extended to National Rail (2 January 2010)
- Contactless cards can be used on London Buses (End of 2012)
- Cash no longer accepted on buses. Cash ticket machines removed from bus stops in central London (Summer 2014)
- Contactless cards can be used on London Underground, Docklands Light Railway, London Overground and National Rail services. Weekly capping introduced on contactless cards. (September 2014)
- 'One Day Bus and Tram Pass' paper ticket introduced in 2015. Can be used for a maximum of one day only and cannot be reloaded with credit. Allows the user to have unlimited journeys on buses and trams. (March 2015)
- Apple Pay, Android Pay and Samsung Pay accepted (2015-2016)
- Online top-ups ready to collect at any station or on any bus within 30 minutes - previously users had to nominate a station and collect next day. Collection on buses was also unavailable (July 2017)
- Official TfL Oyster card app introduced for iOS and Android devices (August 2017)
- 'Hopper Fare' introduced whereby users can make 2 journeys for £1.50 within 1 hour. This was improved in 2018 with the ability to make unlimited journeys within 1 hour for the same fare (January 2018)
- Weekly capping is introduced on adult pay-as-you-go Oyster cards. (September 2021)

=== Roll-out on National Rail ===
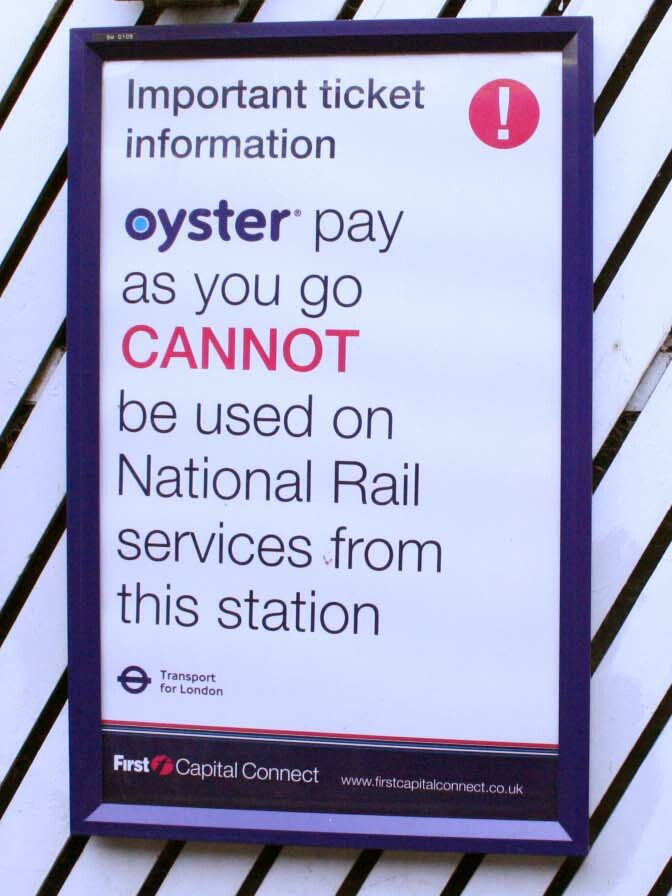
Until January 2010, many rail operators did not accept Oyster PAYG and posted warning notices inside their stations.

The National Rail network is mostly outside the control of Transport for London, and passenger services are run by a number of independent rail companies. Because of this, acceptance of Oyster PAYG on National Rail services was subject to the policy of each individual company and the roll-out of PAYG was much slower than on TfL services. For the first six years of Oyster, rollout on National Rail was gradual and uneven, with validity limited to specific lines and stations.

Several rail companies have accepted London Underground single fares because they duplicate London Underground routes, and they adopted the Oyster PAYG on those sections of the line which run alongside the Underground. When TfL took over the former Silverlink Metro railway lines, PAYG was rolled out on the first day of operation of London Overground. As a consequence, some rail operators whose services run parallel to London Overground lines were forced to accept PAYG, although only after some initial hesitation.

Examples of these services include London Midland trains from Watford Junction to London Euston and Southern trains to Clapham Junction.

The process of persuading the various rail firms involved a long process of negotiation between the London Mayors and train operating companies. In 2005 Ken Livingstone (then Mayor of London) began a process of trying to persuade National Rail train operating companies to allow Oyster PAYG on all of their services within London, but a dispute about ticketing prevented this plan from going ahead. After further negotiations, Transport for London offered to fund the train operating companies with £20m to provide Oyster facilities in London stations; this resulted in an outline agreement to introduce PAYG acceptance across the entire London rail network.

TfL announced a National Rail rollout date of May 2009, but negotiation with the private rail firms continued to fail and the rollout was delayed to 2010. Oyster readers were installed at many National Rail stations across London, but they remained covered up and not in use. In November 2009 it was finally confirmed that PAYG would be valid on National Rail from January 2010. The rollout was accompanied by the introduction of a new system of Oyster Extension Permits to allow travelcard holders to travel outside their designated zones on National Rail. This system was introduced to address the revenue protection concerns of the rail companies, but it was criticised for its complexity, and was abolished on 22 May 2011.

Outside the London fare zones, since 2010, stations have been added into the area of Oyster acceptance, utilising the unused fare zones in the card. The expansion continued until August 2019 when all available zones were fully utilised and new stations could not be placed into an existing zone; since then further expansions have been contactless-only which doesn't have such a limitation.

==== Detailed roll-out history ====
- 2004: Interavailable routes, excluding intermediate non-interavailable stops
- 11 November 2007: London Overground
- 2 January 2008: Intermediate stops on interavailable routes on c2c, Greater Anglia and Chiltern Railways
- 17 September 2008: GWR route within London
- 22 November 2009: Balham to Victoria on Southern
- 2 January 2010: all stations within zones 1-6, and c2c stations up to Grays
- October 2011: Extension to Greater Anglia stations beyond zone 6 announced
- January 2013: Brentwood, Shenfield, stations beyond zone 6 to Broxbourne on the West Anglia main line
- 6 September 2015: Dartford
- 11 January 2016: stations beyond Coulsdon South to Gatwick Airport
- 9 March 2016: Swanley
- 25 February 2019: Epsom
- 2 April 2019: Cuffley, Bayford, Hertford North
- August 2019: Radlett, Potters Bar

== Impact ==
After the introduction of the Oyster card, the number of customers paying cash fares on buses dropped dramatically. In addition, usage of station ticket offices has dropped, to the extent that in June 2007, TfL announced that a number of their ticket offices would close, with some others reducing their opening hours. TfL suggested that the staff would be 're-deployed' elsewhere on the network, including as train drivers.

In August 2010 the issue of the impact of the Oyster card on staffing returned. In response to the National Union of Rail, Maritime and Transport Workers (RMT) ballot for a strike over planned job cuts, TfL stated that the increase in people using Oyster electronic ticketing cards meant only one in 20 journeys now involved interaction with a ticket office. As a result, it aimed to reduce staff in ticket offices and elsewhere while deploying more workers to help passengers in stations.

== Usage statistics ==
Since the launch of contactless payment in 2012, over 500 million journeys have been made using contactless, using over 12 million contactless bank cards.

In 2019, over 12 million Oyster cards and 35 million contactless cards were used, generating around £5bn in ticketing revenue.

== Future ==
=== Beyond London ===
Since January 2010, Oyster PAYG has been valid at c2c stations Purfleet, Ockendon, Chafford Hundred and Grays in Thurrock (Essex).

On 2 January 2013, Oyster PAYG was extended to Shenfield (a terminus of the Elizabeth line) and Broxbourne by Abellio Greater Anglia.

With regard to London's airports, TfL and BAA studied acceptance of Oyster Pay As You Go on BAA's Heathrow Express service and the Southern-operated Gatwick Express service in 2006, but BAA decided not to go ahead. However, Oyster has been valid to Gatwick Airport on both the Gatwick Express and Southern Rail and Thameslink services since January 2016.

Oyster was extended to Rye House, St Margarets, Ware and Hertford East on 19 October 2015.

Oyster was extended to Epsom and Hertford North in early 2019, and to Potters Bar and Radlett in August 2019, the final expansion of the Oyster network.

There were proposals to extend the PAYG service to Reading after the Elizabeth line was opened, utilising the final remaining fare zone F, but it didn't happen and the line eventually became contactless-only.

=== Non-Oyster contactless payment ===
In 2014, London became the first city in the world to accept payment from contactless bank cards. TfL first started accepting contactless debit and credit cards on London Buses on 13 December 2012, expanding to the Underground, Tram and the Docklands Light Railway in September 2014. Since 2016, contactless payment can also take place using contactless-enabled mobile devices such as phones and smartwatches, using Apple Pay, Google Pay and Samsung Pay.

The same requirement to touch in and out on underground services applies with debit and credit cards. The same price capping that applies to the use of Oyster cards applies to the use of debit and credit cards (provided the same card is used for all the day's journeys). Each day, the fare total is settled with the card issuer and appears on the debit or credit card statement. Detailed usage data is written to Transport for London's systems and is available for customers who register their contactless cards with Transport for London. Unlike an Oyster card, a contactless card does not store credit (beyond the holder's credit limit) and there is no need or facility to add credit to the card.

==== Advantages of Oyster ====
While contactless payment cards can be used for most purposes, the Oyster card retains some advantages. An Oyster card can have a longer-term "season" ticket, or a discount loaded onto it, which is not yet available on contactless bank cards (as of 2025). Unlike an Oyster card, a contactless card has the advantage of automatically applying a seven-day Monday-to-Sunday travel-card rate: if the card is used several times in any Monday-to-Sunday period (but only Monday-to-Sunday, unlike a seven-day ticket on an Oyster card), an automatic cap is applied. As of 2025 there is no automatic cap for other periods.

Since the Oyster readers cannot write to a contactless card, the reader when touching out is unable to display the fare charged for the journey, as the card does not have the starting point stored in it. This is calculated overnight once the touch-in and touch-out information is downloaded from the gates and collated. If the card is registered with TfL, journey charges can be checked online from the following day. When a touch-in with a contactless card is made, the validity of the card is checked by debiting the card account with 10 pence. The final fare charged excludes this initial charge.

As with Oyster, a failure to touch either in or out charges the maximum possible fare; this may also happen if different cards are used for tapping in and out, and if payment is made by a mobile device unavailable for tapping out, e.g. when the battery is discharged. Transport for London states that if ticket inspection is taking place, it is then necessary to present the contactless card to the ticket inspector's portable Oyster card reader. As the reader at the starting station cannot write to the contactless card and the card's use is not downloaded until the following night, it is not possible to determine if the card was used to touch into the system. However, after reconciliation if it was found that the card was not touched in at the moment of revenue inspection, a maximum fare would be charged as a failed revenue inspection, and the card may be blocked from further use.

=== App ===
In late 2017, TfL introduced the free Oyster and contactless app which allowed users to check their balance on a compatible Android or iOS smartphone. Users could top up their Oyster card on the go, and check journey history. Top-ups are available to collect at any London Underground station or bus within 30 minutes. The app could also notify users when their balance drops below a specified amount.

In January 2025, TfL released an update to their flagship journey planner app, TfL Go, which implemented the same features as the original standalone app. At the same time, they announced their intent to shut down the original Oyster and contactless app in favour of the new update.

First-generation Oyster cards, identified by not having a "D" at the bottom left corner of the back (see images of the back of both generation cards above), can be used but are not compatible with either app, and TfL recommends that users get a new card and transfer credit, season tickets, and refundable deposit from the old one.

== Visual design ==
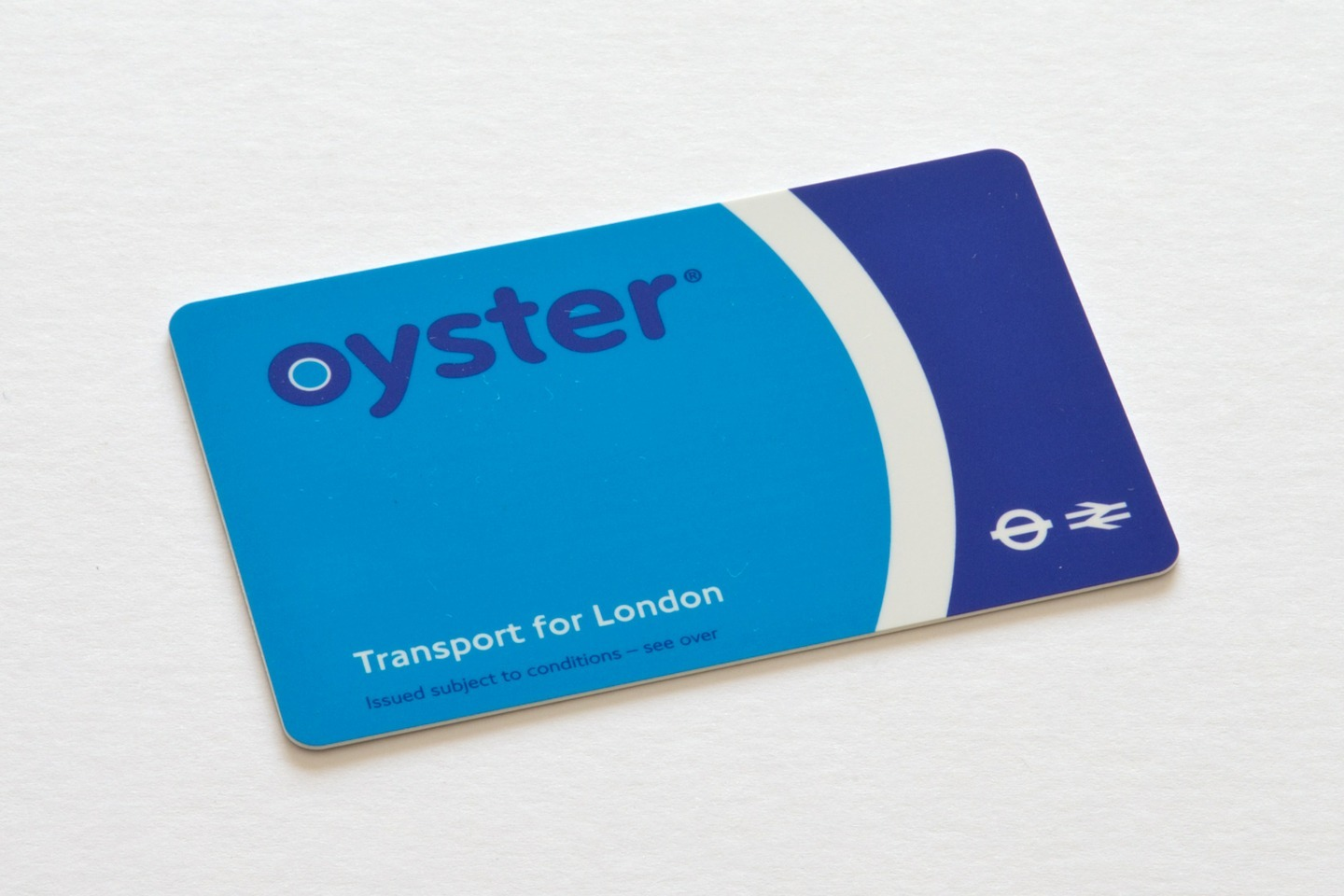
Oyster card visual design

=== Design ===
The design of the Oyster card has generally remained the same since its introduction in 2003, with dark blue and cyan separated by a white swoop. There have been three issues of the standard Oyster card, including the original red roundel issue, but all three Oyster cards have retained their original dimensions of 85 mm x 55 mm, with Oyster card number and reference number located in the top right-hand corner and bottom right hand corner of the back of the card respectively, along with the terms and conditions. The current Oyster card has Transport for London branding on the front of the card, with Mayor of London on the back of the card underneath the terms and conditions.

Standard issues of the Oyster card have been updated since the first public release in order to meet TfL's Design Standards. Trial versions, Transport for London staff versions and the first version of the standard Oyster card for the public were released with the roundels on the front of the cards in red. The second issue of the standard Oyster card had 'Transport for London' branding on the back of the card, and mayor of London branding that replaced the "LONDON" branding in the blue segment of the card's back. The roundel on the front of the card was changed from the colour red to white, as white was seen to represent Transport for London (whereas a red roundel is more commonly known to represent London Buses).

=== Oyster card holder/wallet ===
With the release of the Oyster card, TfL released an accompanying Oyster card holder to replace the existing designs, previously sponsored by companies such as Yellow Pages, Direct Line and IKEA, as well as London Underground's and London Buses' own releases of the holder which came without advertising.

The official Oyster branded holders have been redesigned on several occasions, keeping up with various iterations of the card and to increase service awareness. The initial version mimicked the blue design of the card itself, and was later modified to include the line "Please reuse your card" on the front.

In March 2007 the Oyster card wallet was designed by British designers including Katharine Hamnett, Frostfrench and Gharani Strok for Oxfam's I'm In campaign to end world poverty. The designer wallets were available for a limited period of time from Oxfam's street teams in London who handed them out to people who signed up to the I'm In movement. Also, to celebrate 100 years of the Piccadilly line, a series of limited edition Oyster card wallets were commissioned from selected artists from the Thin Cities Platform for Art project. The previous wallets handed out were sponsored by IKEA who also sponsor the tube map, and did not display the Oyster or the London Underground logos.

In late 2007 the standard issue wallets were redesigned with the only changes being the colour scheme changing from blue to black, and the removal of the resemblance to the Oyster card.

The most recent variation of the wallet came with the introduction of contactless payment acceptance on the network in 2012, where light-green "Watch out for card clash" wallets have been issued to raise awareness of "card clash", and replace the previous simplistic designs. The inside of these wallets reads "Only touch one card on the reader" on the clear plastic.

In 2015 Mel Elliot won the London Design Awards with her "Girls Night Out" themed wallet.

In addition to the official wallets distributed by TfL, which may or may not carry advertising for a sponsor, Oyster card holders and wallets are sometimes used as a marketing tool by other organisations seeking to promote their identity or activities. Such items are normally given away free, either with products or handed out to the public.

Historically, customers were given a free wallet when purchasing a card, and wallets could be picked up for free at most stations or newsagents, though in September 2019 TfL announced that they were discontinuing their free Oyster Card wallets citing the cost and also the use of plastic.

=== Staff variants ===
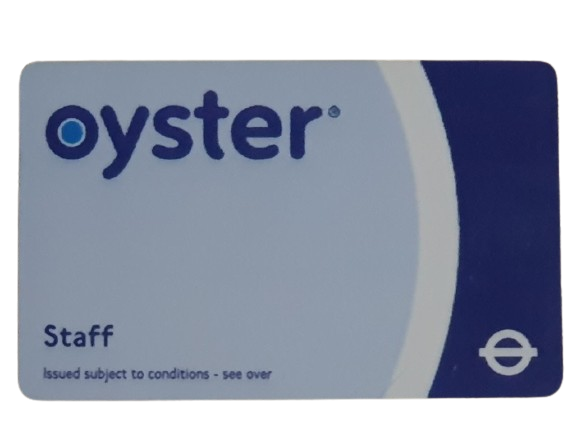
A staff oyster card

Staff Oyster cards (also known as Staff Passes) are issued by Transport for London to active staff and one nominee of their choice. Staff nominees must be 16 or older, and reside at the same address as the staff member. They are also issued to retired TfL staff. They allow free travel on all TfL modes, and are not valid on National Rail services with some minor exceptions. TfL Engineers and Contractors are also issued their own respective Oyster cards, subject to different restrictions to regular staff variants; however, unlike full-time staff, they cannot select nominees. Constables from the City of London Police and the Metropolitan Police all have unique Oyster cards that allow them full access for law enforcement purposes. British Transport Police have separate Oyster cards for their constables and police staff/PCSOs, which are both also granted full access.

=== Design variants ===
The standard Oyster card designs are as follows:

- Standard Oyster card, Blue: Design has remained mostly the same since its introduction in 2003, but very minor text changes on the reverse continue to occur. These are issued when limited edition cards are not in circulation
- One Day Bus and Tram Pass, Green: Introduced in January 2015, this card carries the "Oyster" branding and can only be used for a maximum of one day, as it cannot be reloaded with credit. It is half the thickness of a standard Oyster card, as it is meant to be discarded when it expires. The card allows the user unlimited travel on bus and tram until the next day.
- Visitor Oyster Card: A visitor card is designed for use by tourists to London and can be delivered to their home address before they arrive. Tourists can benefit from special offers and discounts and save money in leading London restaurants, shops and entertainment venues on presentation of this card. A discount is also offered on the London Cable Car service.

A number of limited edition Oyster card variant designs exist. These are produced in limited quantities but otherwise function as standard Oyster cards. These include:

- 2011 Wedding of Prince William and Catherine Middleton. (750k produced)
- 2012 Queen Elizabeth II's Diamond Jubilee Portrait Version. (250k issued)
- 2012 Queen Elizabeth II's Diamond Jubilee Buckingham Palace Edition. (1.5m issued)
- 2012 London 2012 Games - various designs listed below.
- 2012 150th Anniversary of London Underground. (1m produced)
- 2014 TfL Year of the Bus. (1.4m produced)
- 2018 Adidas x TfL (3 variations with 500 of each produced).
- 2022 Adidas Arsenal (1000 produced)
- 2022 Elizabeth Line
- 2023 Oyster 20th anniversary

In 2012, TfL released various cards to mark the Olympic Games taking place in London that year. The cards performed the same as any other card and also included all the same text, apart from a differentiating line (listed below), and the London 2012 logo. Cards like these were distributed solely to select 2012 volunteers who took part in the opening and closing ceremonies. They were used for the duration of the games and therefore are no longer valid for use on the transport system. The colour of these Oyster cards is pink with a coloured stripe:

- "London Olympic Games", Pink stripe.
- "London Paralympic Games", Blue stripe.
- "Olympic Volunteer", Green stripe.
- "Paralympic Volunteer", Orange Stripe.
- "2012 Ceremonies Volunteer", Purple stripe.

Three design variations of the Oyster visitor cards also exist:

- 2007 Tutankhamun and the Golden Age of the Pharaohs exhibition at the O2.
- 2007 Standard version showing the London Eye, St Paul's Cathedral, 30 St Mary Axe and the Millennium Bridge.
- 2012 Visitor Oyster card containing letters made up of landmarks spelling LONDON.

== Collaborations ==
In October 2018, TfL partnered with Adidas to celebrate 15 years of the Oyster card. A limited number of trainers from the "Oyster Club pack" went on sale with each of the three types costing £80 and being based on an element of the Tube's history. These designs include Temper Run, ZX 500RM and Continental 80. Only 500 limited-edition Oyster cards were produced, and each type of trainer contains a different card design in the box. Also included with the trainers is a genuine leather case (with TfL and Adidas logo engraving) and a credit of £80 preloaded on the Oyster card.

== Issues and criticisms ==
=== Touching out penalties ===
Card users sometimes forget to touch in or touch out, cannot find the yellow readers or find it too crowded to touch out. Such card users have either received penalty fares from revenue inspectors, been charged a maximum fare, or been prosecuted in courts which can issue high penalties. Card users are also penalised for touching in and out of the same station within a two-minute period, and charged the maximum possible fare from that station.

The system also applies two maximum fares (one for touching in, and one for touching out) to passengers who touch in and touch out at the same station after 30 minutes; this is due to the system assuming that, after such a long delay, the passenger has travelled to another station and returned without touching in or out at the other station, when in reality the passenger might simply have been waiting for a train, baulked at the long waiting time and exited.

=== Extension fares ===
Holders of Travelcards can add pay-as-you-go credit on their Oyster cards. This credit is used as an 'extension fare' when users travel beyond the zones in which their Travelcard is valid. This extension fare equals the regular Oyster fare for a journey from/to the respective station outside of the validity area of the Travelcard to/from the closest zone still covered by the Travelcard. To distinguish between peak and off-peak fares, however, the start of the journey is taken into account. That means travellers might be charged the (more expensive) peak fare as an extension fare even if they had not yet left the area of validity of their Travelcard by the end of peak time. Conversely, a journey starting in the covered zones shortly before the start of the peak time will be charged as off-peak.

There is an exploitable feature of the system, in that if a touch-in (or touch-out) is made in a zone where the Oyster card is loaded with a valid season ticket or Travelcard but there is no associated touch-out (or touch-in), the system does not charge a fare. Although encouraged to do so, such ticket holders are not obliged to touch in or touch out within the zones of their ticket's validity (other than to operate a barrier), and it may in fact be impossible to do so when combining with a paper extension ticket for travelling outside the zones. This means that a passenger holding (say) a valid zone 1&2 Travelcard can touch in at a zone 1 station (to open the ticket barrier) and then travel to a zone 3, 4, 5 or 6 station that does not have a barrier without touching out or paying the extension fare. Ticket inspectors frequently operate at such locations to catch these fare-dodging passengers. Since the system maintains a record of every touch the card does make (even with a valid Travelcard), TfL will seek to recover all the unpaid fares when a passenger who is caught is prosecuted for fare evasion.

From January 2010 to May 2011, passengers using an Oyster card with a Travelcard loaded seeking to start a journey in their paid-for zones and end it outside those zones were expected to use a ticket vending machine to set an Oyster Extension Permit (OEP) on their card before starting their journey. The effect of this setting was that a maximum journey charge was deducted from the card when touching in even within their zones, and this removed the incentive to "forget" to touch out at the end of the journey. The OEP system was poorly understood by staff and passengers alike and was abolished after less than a year and a half.

=== Privacy ===
The system has been criticised as a threat to the privacy of its users. Each Oyster card is uniquely numbered, and registration is required for monthly or longer tickets, which are no longer available on paper. Limited usage data is stored on the card. Journey and transaction history is held centrally by Transport for London for up to eight weeks, after which the transactions and journey history are disassociated from the Oyster card and cannot be re-associated; full registration details are held centrally and not on individual Oyster cards; recent usage can be checked by anyone in possession of the card at some ticket machines.

The police have used Oyster card data as an investigative tool, and this use is increasing. On 13 April 2006, TfL stated that "Between August 2004 and March 2006 TfL's Information Access and Compliance Team received 436 requests from the police for Oyster card information. Of these, 409 requests were granted and the data were released to the police". However, in response to another request in February 2012, "TfL said this had happened 5,295 times in 2008, 5,359 in 2009, 5,046 in 2010, and a record 6,258 in 2011".

Additionally, in 2008 news reports indicated that the security services were seeking access to all Oyster card data for the purposes of counter-terrorism. Such access is not provided to the security services.

As yet, there have been no reports of customer data being misused, outside the terms of the registration agreement. There have been no reports of Oyster data being lost.

=== Design ===
The system has been criticised for usability issues in its general system, website and top-up machine design.

Oyster pay-as-you-go users, on London Underground, DLR and National Rail (including London Overground) services are required always to "touch in" and "touch out" to cause the correct fare to be charged. This requirement is less obviously enforced at stations where there are only standalone yellow readers rather than ticket barriers. Without a physical barrier, pay-as-you-go users may simply forget to "touch in" or fail to touch their card correctly, which will result in a maximum fare being charged. Equally, if the barriers do not function (reading 'SEEK ASSISTANCE') and the TfL or train operating company staff member has to open the gates manually, then the maximum fare may be charged. If this occurs a refund may be requested by telephoning the Oyster helpline the day after the incident occurs (to allow time for the central computers to be updated); the overcharged amount can be added back to the pay-as-you-go balance on the card from the following day when the Oyster card is used to make a journey.

The use of Oyster cards on buses has been subject to criticism following a number of successful criminal prosecutions by TfL of bus passengers whose Oyster card, when checked by Revenue Protection Inspectors, did not show that the passenger had "touched in" correctly on boarding. In particular, problems have been highlighted in connection with the quality of error messages given to passengers when touching in has failed for any reason. In one case, a passenger successfully appealed against his conviction for fare evasion when the court noted that the passenger believed he had paid for his journey because the Oyster reader did not give sufficient error warning.

In 2011, London Assembly member Caroline Pidgeon obtained figures from the mayor of London which revealed that in 2010, £60 million had been taken by TfL in maximum Oyster fares. The statistics also detailed a "top ten" of stations where maximum fares were being collected, notably Waterloo and London Bridge. In her criticism of the figures, Pidgeon claimed that "structural problems" with the Oyster system were to blame, such as faulty equipment failing to register cards and difficulty in obtaining refunds. A report by BBC London highlighted the system of "autocomplete" (in which Oyster card journeys are automatically completed without the need to physically touch out, exceptionally used when large crowds are exiting stations) as particularly problematic.

=== Technical faults ===
In January 2004, on the day that the pay-as-you-go system went live on all Oyster cards, some season ticket passengers were prevented from making a second journey on their travelcard. Upon investigation each had a negative prepay balance. This was widely reported as a major bug in the system. However, the reason for the "bug" was that some season ticket holders were passing through zones not included on their tickets, and the holders had been correctly charged pay-as-you-go fares for the zones they hadn't paid for. The existing paper system, and the previous Travelcard-only system, could not prevent this kind of misuse as the barriers only checked if a paper ticket was valid in the zone the barrier was in.

On 10 March 2005 an incorrect data table meant that the Oyster system was inoperable during the morning rush hour. Ticket barriers had to be left open and pay as you go fares could not be collected.

On 12 July 2008 an incorrect data table disabled an estimated 72,000 Oyster cards, including Travelcards, staff passes, Freedom Passes, child Oyster cards and other electronic tickets. The Oyster system was shut down and later restarted during traffic hours. Some customers already in the system were overcharged. Refunds were given to those affected and all disabled cards were replaced. Freedom Pass holders had to apply to their local authority for replacement passes (as these are not managed by TfL).

A further system failure occurred two weeks later on 25 July 2008, when pay as you go cards were not read properly.

On 2 January 2016 the Oyster system failed, with readers failing to process Oyster cards but continuing to process contactless cards and Apple Pay transactions.

=== The difference between pay as you go and Travelcards ===
Transport for London promoted the Oyster card at launch with many adverts seeking to portray it as an alternative to the paper Travelcard. In late 2005 the Advertising Standards Authority ordered the withdrawal of one such poster which claimed that Oyster pay as you go was "more convenient" than Travelcards with "no need to plan in advance". The ASA ruled that the two products were not directly comparable, mainly because the pay-as-you-go facility was not valid on most National Rail routes at the time.

Transport for London has made a significant surplus from excess fares deducted for those travelling using PAYG and failing to touch out as they exit stations. According to information obtained under the Freedom of Information Act TfL made £32m from pay as you go cards of which £18m was maximum fares for failing to touch out. Only £803,000 was paid in refunds, showing that whilst customers can apply for a refund, most do not. The Oyster online site does not list all maximum fares eligible for refunds on the front page, and users must search for fares charged on a particular day to discover all maximum fares that have been charged. The maximum fares for failing to touch out were introduced in late 2006.

=== Validity on National Rail ===
Until the availability of Oyster pay-as-you-go on the whole of the National Rail suburban network in January 2010, the validity of PAYG was not consistent across different modes of transport within London, and this gave rise to confusion for Oyster pay-as-you-go users. Many passengers were caught out trying to use Pay as you go on rail routes where it was not valid.

On some National Rail routes where pay-as-you-go was valid, Oyster validators had not been installed at some intermediate stations. While Oyster pay-as-you-go users could legally travel along those lines to certain destinations, they were not permitted to board or alight at intermediate stations. If their journey began or ended at an intermediate station, they would be unable to touch out and consequently be liable for penalty fares or prosecution.

The complexity of Oyster validity on these routes was criticised for increasing the risk of passengers inadvertently failing to pay the correct fare. Criticism was also levelled at train operating companies for failing to provide adequate warnings to passengers about Oyster validity on their routes and for not installing Oyster readers at certain stations.

TfL published guides to the limitations of pay-as-you-go validity; diagrammatic maps illustrating PAYG validity were published in November 2006 by National Rail, but these were rarely on display at stations and had to be obtained from transport websites.

Even after PAYG was rolled out to the whole of London, passengers are still frequently caught out at locations outside the PAYG area, having tapped into the system in London and travelled on a train out of London, such as at Stansted Airport. This trap equally applies to contactless payment passengers as well as Oyster users.

=== Online and telesales ===
Online top-ups can be done via the TfL Go app or an online Contactless and Oyster account. Users need to tap in as part of a normal journey within four days for the top-up to load onto the card. Failure to make a journey will mean the top-up order fails and a refund is processed automatically.

Historically, Oyster card ticket renewals and pay-as-you-go top-ups made online allowed users to make purchases without the need to go to a ticket office or vending machine. However, there were certain limitations to this system:

- Tickets and pay-as-you-go funds can only be added to the Oyster card from 30 minutes after purchase (if bought online);
- users must select a station or tram stop where they must touch in or out as part of a normal journey to complete the purchase (as cards cannot be credited remotely);
- users must nominate the station in advance – failure to enter or exit via this station means that the ticket is not added to the card;
- tickets purchased in this way could not be added from a bus reader (due to these not being fixed in a permanent location).

=== Security issues ===
In June 2008, researchers at the Radboud University in Nijmegen, the Netherlands, who had previously succeeded in hacking the OV-chipkaart (the Dutch public transport chip card), hacked an Oyster card, which is also based on the MIFARE Classic chip. They scanned a card reader to obtain its cryptographic key, then used a wireless antenna attached to a laptop computer to brush up against passengers on the London Underground and extract the information from their cards. With that information they were able to clone a card, add credit to it, and use it to travel on the Underground for at least a day. The MIFARE chip manufacturer NXP Semiconductor sought a court injunction to prevent the publication of the details of this security breach, but this was overturned on appeal.

The Mifare Classic—which is also used as a security pass for controlling entry into buildings—has been criticised as having very poor security, and NXP criticised for trying to ensure security by obscurity rather than strong encryption. Breaching security on Oyster cards should not allow unauthorised use for more than a day, as TfL promises to turn off any cloned cards within 24 hours, but a cloned Mifare Classic can allow entry into buildings that use this system for security.

== Strategic research ==
Transport for London, in partnership with academic institutions such as MIT, has begun to use the data captured by the Oyster smartcard system for strategic research purposes, with the general goal of using Oyster data to gain cheap and accurate insights into the behaviour and experience of passengers. Specific projects include estimation of Origin-Destination Matrices for the London Underground, analysis of bus-to-bus and bus-to-tube interchange behaviour, modelling and analysis of TfL-wide fare policy changes, and measurement of service quality on the London Overground.

== See also ==
- Smartcards on National Rail
- CPAY (TfL contactless payment)
- List of smart cards
- Radio-frequency identification
