= Medium error =

In digital storage, a Medium Error is a class of errors that a storage device can experience, which imply that a physical problem was encountered when trying to access the device. The word "medium" refers to the physical storage layer, the medium on which the data is stored; as opposed to errors related to e.g. protocol, device/controller/driver state, etc.

Medium errors are most commonly detected by checking the read data against a checksum – itself being most commonly also stored on the same device. The mismatch of data to its supposed checksum is assumed to be caused by the data being corrupted.

Locations of medium errors can be either temporary (as in the case of bit rot – there is no damage to the medium, the data was simply lost), or permanent (as in the case of scratching – the physical location is unusable from that point onwards).

Devices can sometimes recover from medium errors, either by retrying or by managing to reconcile the data with the checksum. If the medium has incurred permanent damage, the device might remap the logical address where the error occurred to a different, undamaged physical location.

Medium errors are often associated with long latency for the IOs. This is due to the device retrying and attempting to recover from the error.

== Examples of conditions that might cause medium errors ==
1. Bad Blocks: These are damaged or defective areas on the storage medium where data cannot be reliably read or written.
2. Media Degradation: Over time, storage media like optical discs or magnetic tapes can degrade, leading to read/write errors.
3. Physical Damage: Physical shocks, drops, or other mechanical damage to the storage device can result in Medium Errors.
4. Media Wear: In the case of hard drives, the read/write heads may wear out or come into contact with the platters, causing errors.
5. Manufacturing Defects: Occasionally, storage media can have manufacturing defects that become evident over time.
6. Environmental Factors: Extreme temperatures, humidity, or exposure to magnetic fields can also lead to Medium Errors.

== See also ==
- Bad sector
- Bit rot
