= Not a typewriter =

Unix error code

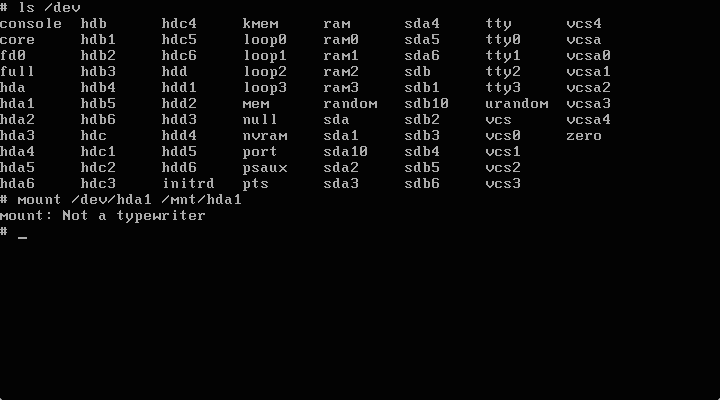
"Not a Typewriter" error code in Linux

In computing, "Not a typewriter" or ENOTTY is an error code defined in the errno.h found on many Unix systems. This code is now used to indicate that an invalid ioctl (input/output control) number was specified in an ioctl system call.

== Details ==
This error originated in early UNIX. In Version 6 UNIX and earlier, I/O control was limited to serial-connected terminal devices, typically a teletype (abbreviated TTY), through the gtty and stty system calls. If an attempt was made to use these calls on a non-terminal device, the error generated was ENOTTY. When the stty/gtty system calls were replaced with the more general ioctl (I/O control) call, the ENOTTY error code was retained.

Early computers and Unix systems used electromechanical typewriters as terminals. The abbreviation TTY, which occurs widely in modern UNIX systems, stands for "Teletypewriter." For example, the original meaning of the SIGHUP signal is that it Hangs UP the phone line on the teletypewriter which uses it. The generic term "typewriter" was probably used because "Teletype" was a registered trademark of AT&T subsidiary Teletype Corporation and was too specific. The name "Teletype" was derived from the more general term "teletypewriter"; using "typewriter" was a different contraction of the same original term.

POSIX sidesteps this issue by describing ENOTTY as meaning "not a terminal".

Because ioctl is now supported on other devices than terminals, some systems display a different message such as "Inappropriate ioctl for device" instead.

== Occurrence ==
In some cases, this message will occur even when no ioctl has been issued by the program. This is due to the way the isatty() library routine works. The error code errno is only set when a system call fails. One of the first system calls made by the C standard I/O library is in an isatty() call used to determine if the program is being run interactively by a human (in which case isatty() will succeed and the library will write its output a line at a time so the user sees a regular flow of text) or as part of a pipeline (in which case it writes a block at a time for efficiency). If a library routine fails for some reason unrelated to a system call (for example, because a user name wasn't found in the password file) and a naïve programmer blindly calls the normal error reporting routine perror() on every failure, the leftover ENOTTY will result in an utterly inappropriate "Not a typewriter" (or "Not a teletype", or "Inappropriate ioctl for device") being delivered to the user.

For many years the UNIX mail program sendmail contained this bug: when mail was delivered from another system, the mail program was being run non-interactively. If the destination address was local, but referred to a user name not found in the local password file, the message sent back to the originator of the email was the announcement that the person they were attempting to communicate with was not a typewriter.

== See also ==
- lp0 on fire
