= Definitive diagnostic data =

Information technology concept

Definitive diagnostic data are a specific type of data used in the investigation and diagnosis of IT system problems; transaction performance, fault/error or incorrect output.

== Qualification ==
To qualify as Definitive Diagnostic Data it must be possible to correlate the data with a user's experience of a problem instance, and for that reason they will typically be time stamped event information. Log and trace records are common sources of Definitive Diagnostic Data.

== Statistical data ==
Generally, statistical data can't be used as it lacks the granularity necessary to directly associate it with a user's experience of a problem instance. However, it can be adapted by reducing the sample interval to a value approaching the response time of the system transaction being performed.

== Further information ==
- Definitive Diagnostic Data, S. Kendrick, Sharkfest 2014 Conference
- Offord, Paul (2011). RPR: A Problem Diagnosis Method for IT Professionals. Advance Seven Limited. ISBN 978-1-4478-4443-3.
