= OnePulse =

Credit card issued by Barclaycard

Front design of a Barclaycard OnePulse Card from 2007

OnePulse was the name given to a credit card that was issued by Barclaycard that combined the functionality of Transport for London's Oyster card with a Visa contactless-enabled credit card. Barclaycard OnePulse was launched in early September 2007. Barclaycard discontinued OnePulse in 2014 and moved cardholders to one of its other cards.

In addition to the normal features of both a Visa credit card and the Oyster product, Barclaycard OnePulse included the ability to pay for low-value items under £10 using the Visa contactless system by waving the card over a reader in participating outlets. Purchases made using either the contactless or standard payment methods were charged to the Barclaycard credit card as opposed to being deducted from the Oyster Pre-Pay account. No PIN was necessary for contactless transactions, providing a similar customer experience to Oyster.

== Security ==
The chip in the card contained risk management logic that prompted the cardholder to revert to a normal (contact) chip and PIN transaction from time to time for security. The standard consumer protections associated with credit cards also applied to contactless transactions, so the consumer was protected in the event of unauthorised use of their card. Shops that participated with the contactless payment scheme were:

- Eat
- Krispy Kreme
- YO! Sushi
- Coffee Republic
- Caffè Nero
- Subway
- Boots
- McDonald's

In addition, many traditional retailers (e.g. corner shop operators) also accepted the cashless element of OnePulse and other contactless payment methods through contactless payment terminals provided by Barclaycard merchant services.

As of September 2012, the card was no longer available to new customers. The official website redirected to a page for existing customers only.

In February 2014, Barclaycard announced that the OnePulse card would be withdrawn from use and all functionality would cease after 30 June 2014. Customers had their OnePulse card replaced with the Freedom Rewards credit card.
