= Transport in Ljubljana =

Ljubljana has an extensive and developed transport network that includes both public and private services.

== Air ==
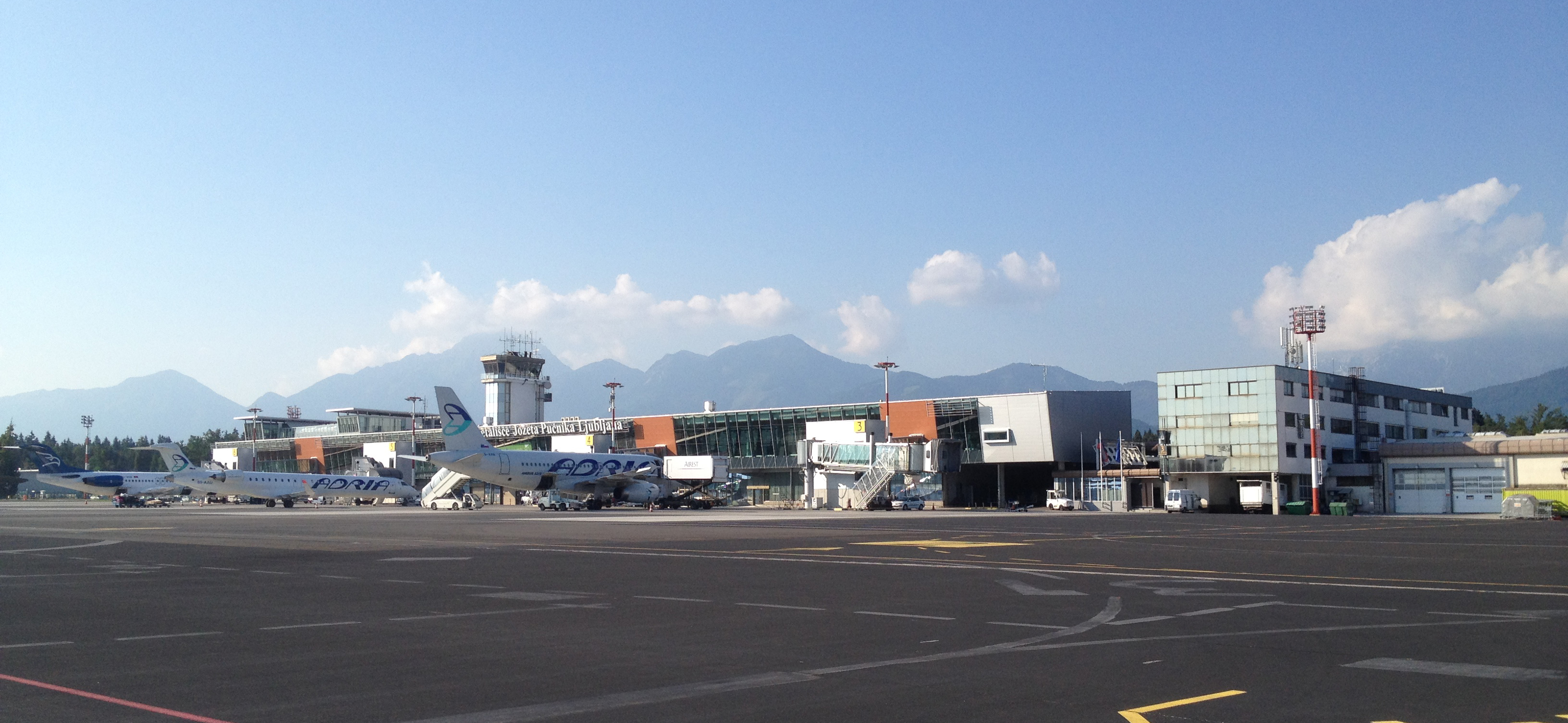
Jože Pučnik Airport

Ljubljana has one airport, with flights to numerous European destinations. The destinations are predominantly European. In the 1980s, Jat Airways offered flights from Chicago to Belgrade that included a nonstop segment between New York City and Ljubljana, however, the flights did not originate out of Ljubljana. The airport was served by Adria Airways, the Slovenian flag carrier until their bankruptcy in 2019.

The current airport has superseded the original Ljubljana airport (Polje), in operation from 1933 until 1963. It was located in the Municipality of Polje (nowadays the Moste District), on a plain between Ljubljanica and Sava next to the railroad in Moste. There was a military airport in Šiška from 1918 until 1929.

On 27 June 1991, two days after Slovenia's Independence from Yugoslavia, the Yugoslav People's Army began its military operations within the country. The airport was bombed during the first day of the war. The next day, 28 June, two journalists from Austria and Germany, Nikolas Vogel and Norbert Werner, were killed by a missile that struck their car near the airport, where they were both driving by at that time. Four Adria Airways airliners also took serious damage from the Yugoslav Air Force. The fighting ended on 7 July with the Brioni Agreement.

On 8 December 2004, the airport received its first annual millionth passenger. Overall, the airport handled 1,721,355 passengers in 2019, representing a 5% drop in traffic figures compared to the previous year. In 2007, the airport was renamed from Aerodrom Ljubljana to Ljubljana Jože Pučnik Airport; named after Jože Pučnik.

== Rail ==
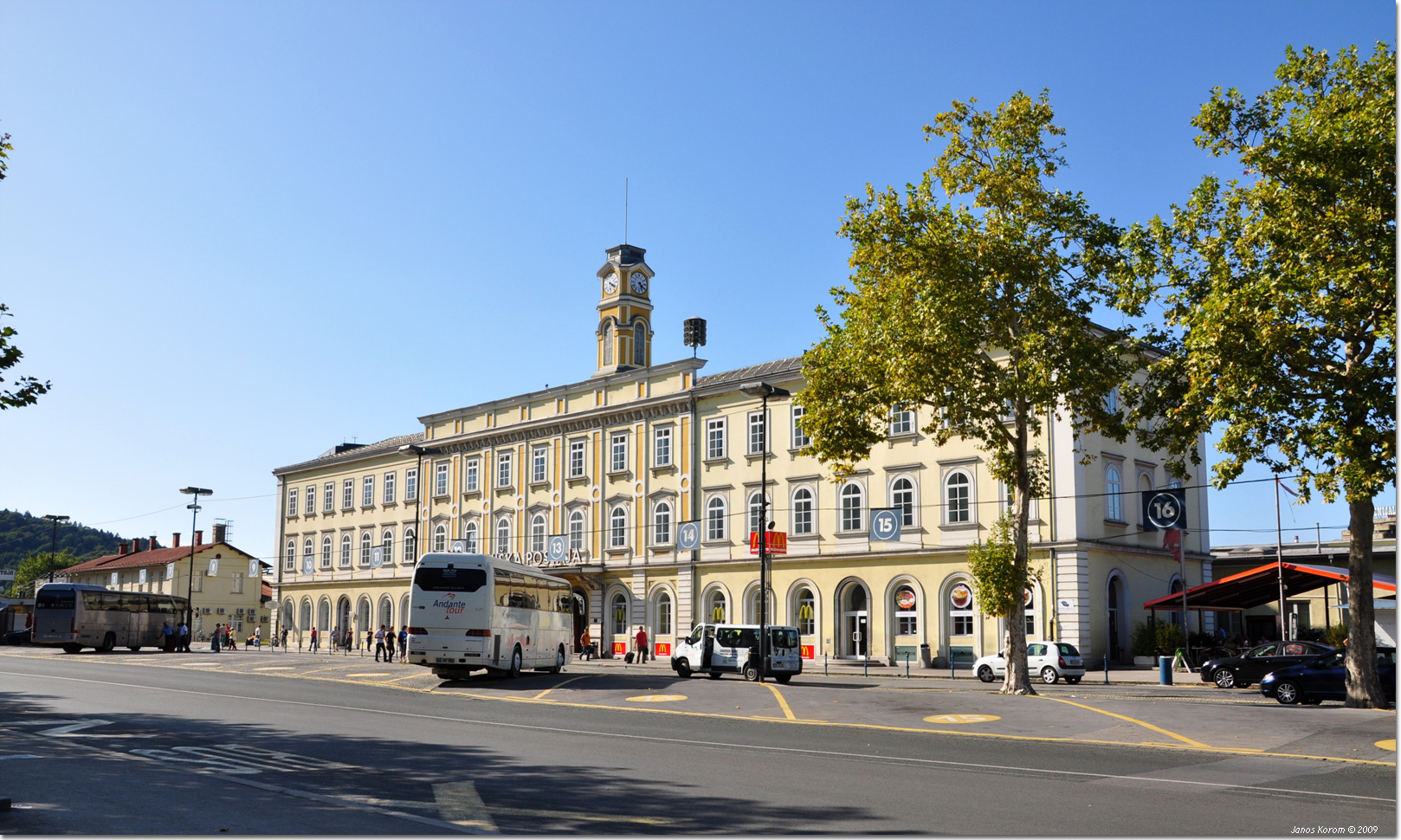
Bus Station and Railway Station

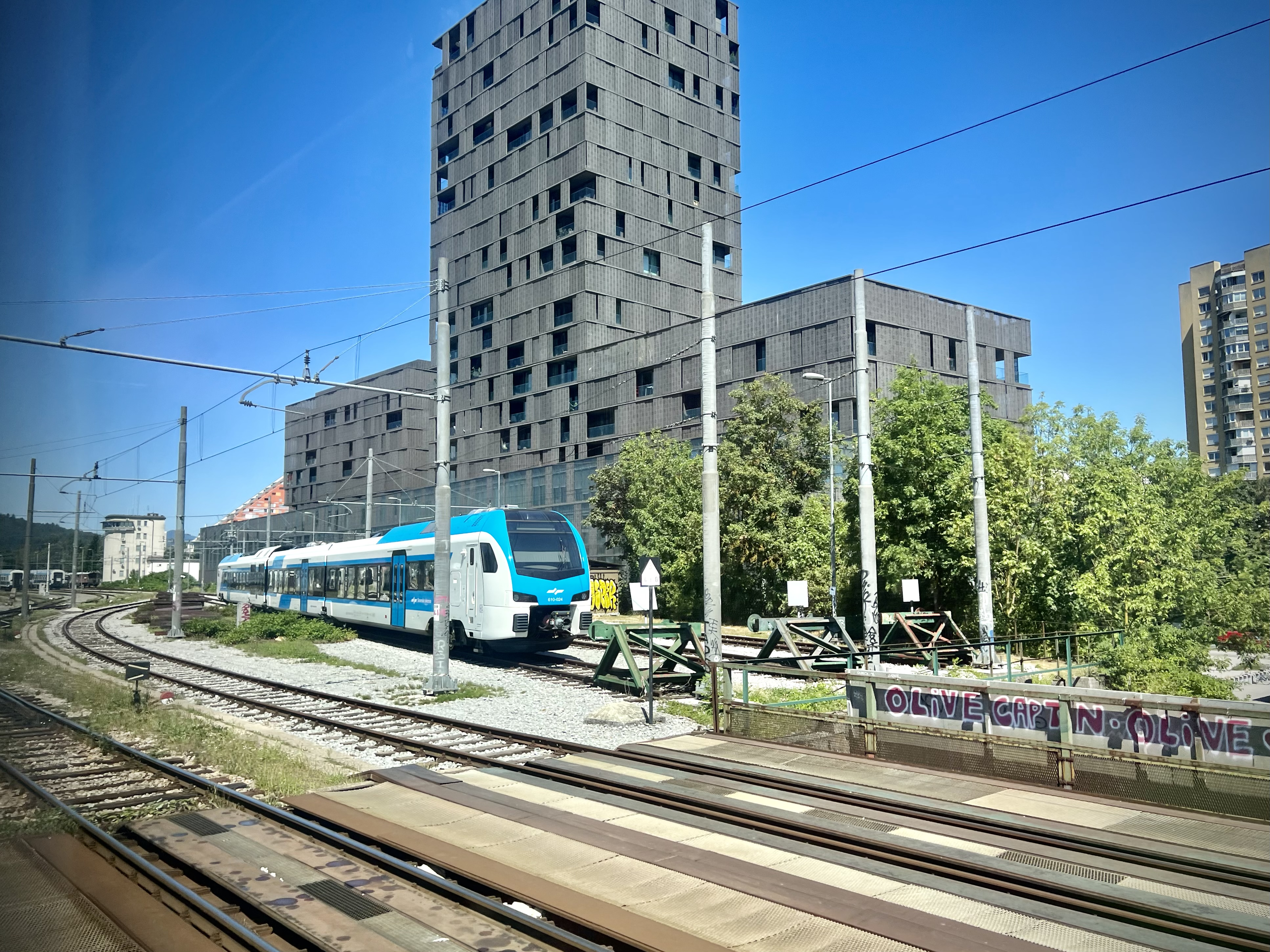
Slovenian Railways train

Ljubljana is a major rail intersection of the Pan-European railway corridors; the V (the fastest link between the North Adriatic, and Central and Eastern Europe) and X (linking Central Europe with the Balkans) and the main European lines (E 65, E 69, E 70) intersect.

All international transit trains in Slovenia drive through the Ljubljana hub, and all international passenger trains stop there.

=== Detail ===
The area of Ljubljana has six passenger stations and nine stops. For passengers, the Slovenian Railways company offers the possibility to buy a daily or monthly city pass that can be used to travel between them. The Ljubljana railway station is the central station of the hub. The Ljubljana Moste Railway Station is the largest Slovenian railway dispatch. The Ljubljana Zalog Railway Station is the central Slovenian rail yard. There are a number of industrial rails in Ljubljana.

At the end of 2006, the Ljubljana Castle funicular started to operate. The rail goes from Krek Square (Krekov trg) near the Ljubljana Central Market to Ljubljana Castle. It is especially popular among tourists. The full trip lasts 60 seconds.

== Road ==
Ljubljana is located where Slovenia's two main motorways intersect, connecting the motorway route from east to west, in line with Pan-European Corridor V, and the motorway in the north–south direction, in line with Pan-European Corridor X. The city is linked to the southwest by A1-E70 to the Italian cities of Trieste and Venice and the Croatian port of Rijeka.

To the north, A1-E57 leads to Maribor, Graz and Vienna. To the east, A2-E70 links it with the Croatian capital Zagreb, from where one can go to Hungary or important cities of the former Yugoslavia, such as Belgrade. To the northwest, A2-E61 goes to the Austrian towns of Klagenfurt and Salzburg, making it an important entry point for northern European tourists.

A toll sticker system has been in use on the Ljubljana Ring Road since 1 July 2008. The centre of the city is more difficult to access especially in the peak hours due to long arteries with traffic lights and a large number of daily commuters. The core city centre has been closed for motor traffic since September 2007 (except for residents with permissions), creating a pedestrian zone around Prešeren Square.

== Public transport ==
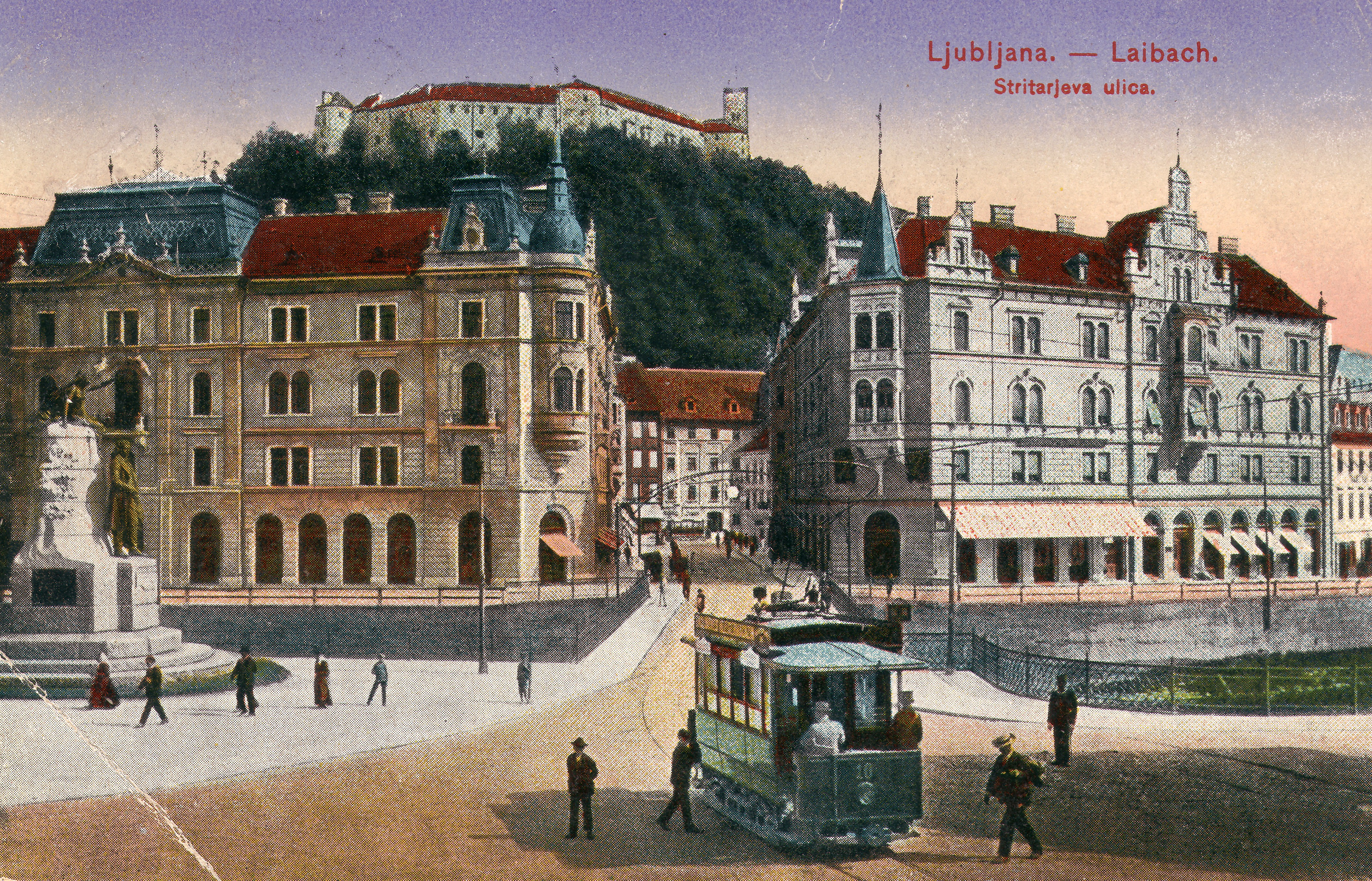
Old postcard showcasing trams in town centre

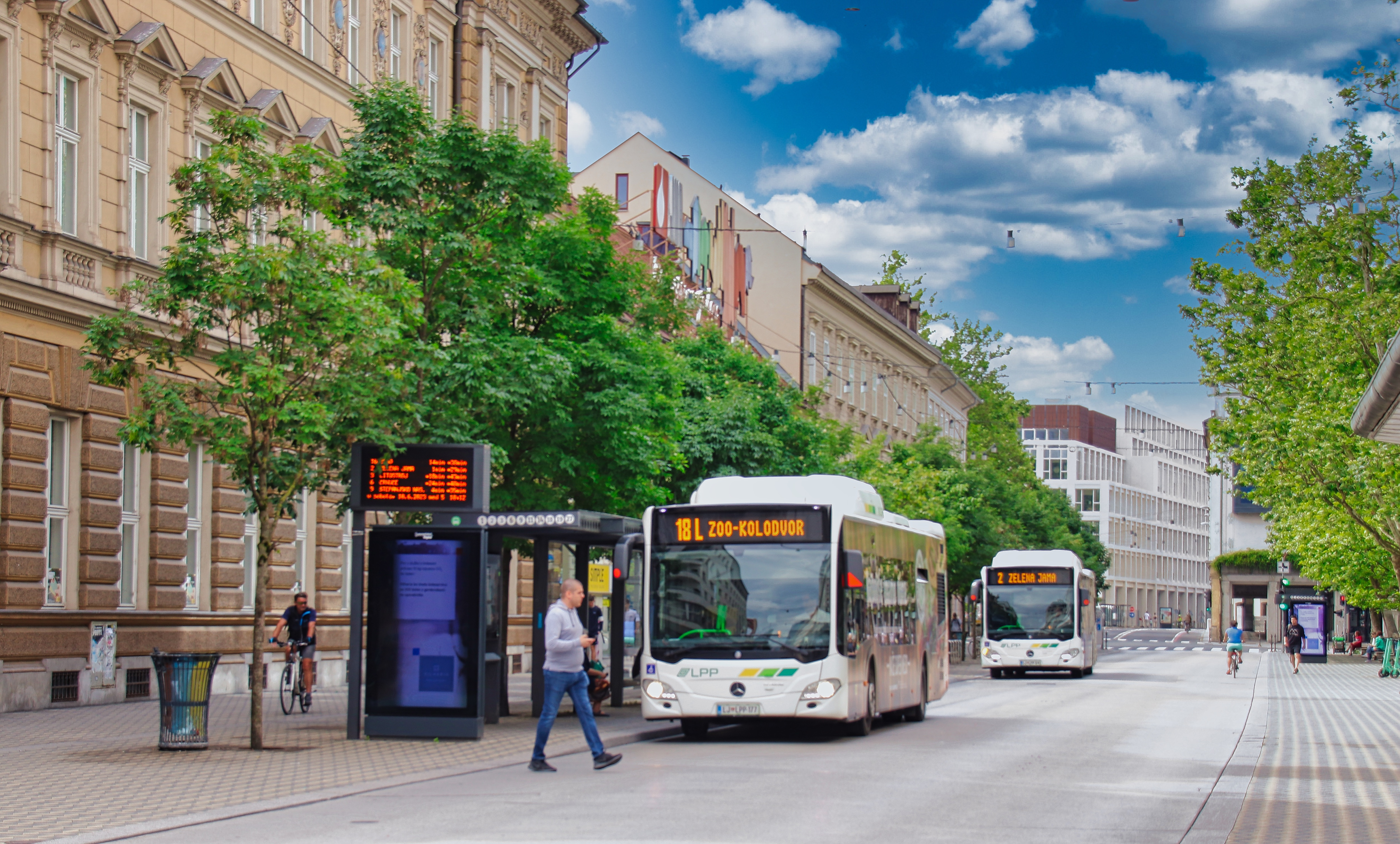
LPP Mercedes buses

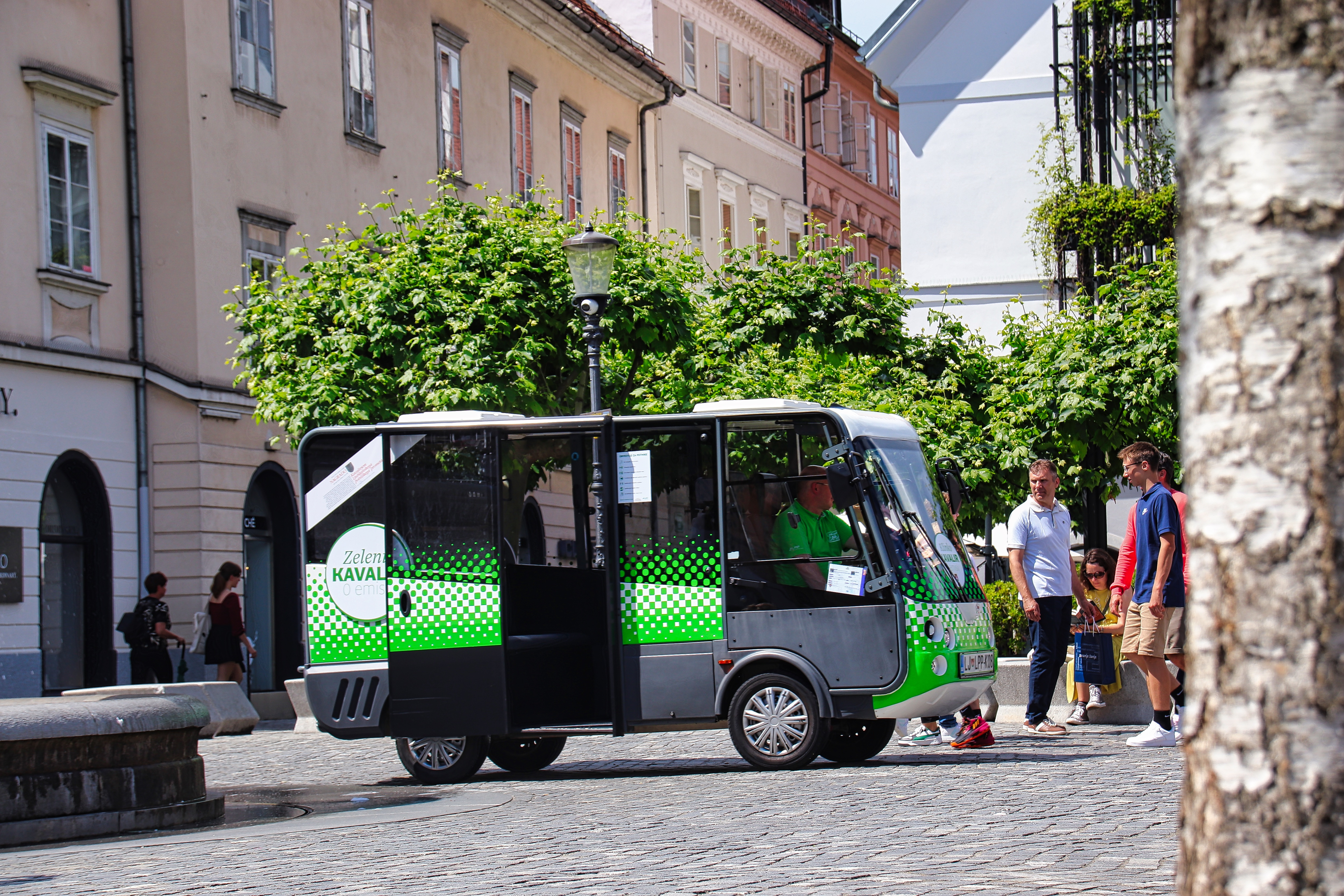
LPP Cavalier (closed version)

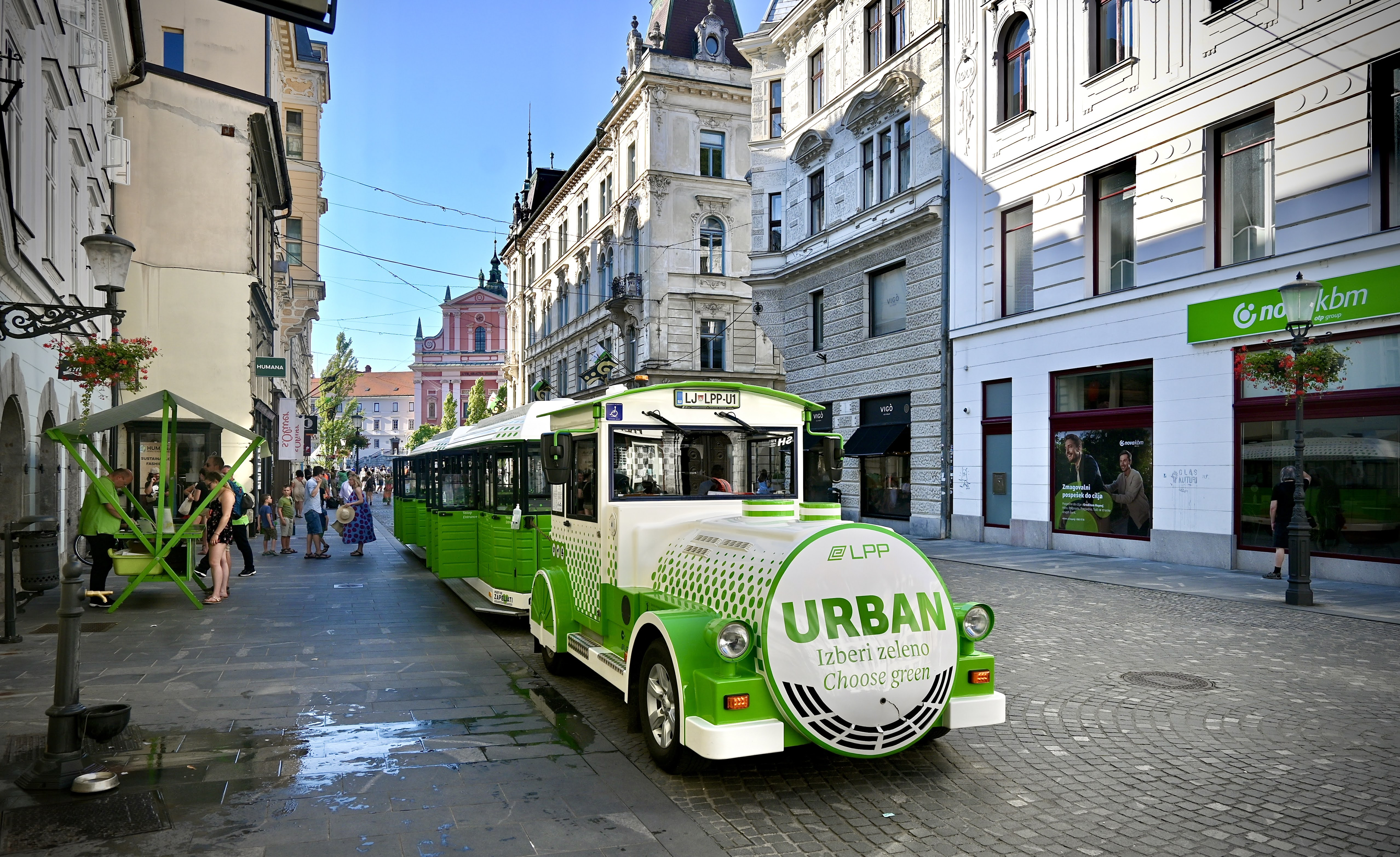
LPP Sightseeing bus

Urban passenger transport in Ljubljana operates according to pre-published routes and timetables. There are currently 32 lines operating with a total length of 460 kilometres (290 mi). They cover approximately 97% of the urban area of the Municipality of Ljubljana, which means that 97% of Ljubljana households are less than 500 meters from the nearest stop.

=== Trams ===
The historical Ljubljana tram system was completed in 1901 and was replaced by buses in 1928, which were in turn abolished and replaced by trams in 1931 with its final length of 18.5 km (11.5 mi) in 1940. In 1959, it was abolished in favor of automobiles; the tracks were dismantled and tram cars were transferred to Osijek and Subotica. Reintroduction of an actual tram system to Ljubljana has been proposed repeatedly in the 2000s.

=== Buses ===
All local and international buses depart from Ljubljana central bus hub. It is located next to the Ljubljana railway station.

The city bus network run by the Ljubljana Passenger Transport (LPP) company is Ljubljana's most widely used means of public transport.

The number of dedicated bus lanes is limited, which can cause problems in peak hours when traffic becomes congested. Sometimes the buses are called trole (referring to trolley poles), harking back to the 1951–1971 days when Ljubljana had trolleybus (trolejbus) service. There were five trolleybus lines in Ljubljana, until 1958 alongside the tram.

From November 2025, LPP will receive its first (carbon-neutral) hydrogen-powered buses.

=== Electric shuttle bus ===
Another means of public road transport in the city centre is the Cavalier (Kavalir), an electric shuttle bus vehicle operated by LPP since May 2009. There are three such vehicles in Ljubljana. The ride is free and there are no stations because it can be stopped anywhere. It can carry up to five passengers; most of them are elderly people and tourists.

The Cavalier drives in the car-free zone in the Ljubljana downtown. The first line links Čop Street, Wolf Street and the Hribar Embankment, whereas the second links Town Square, Upper Square, and Old Square. There is also a trackless train (tractor with wagons decorated to look like a train) for tourists in Ljubljana, linking Cyril and Methodius Square in the city centre with Ljubljana Castle.

=== Airport bus ===
Ljubljana Jože Pučnik Airport is connected by a public bus (operated by Arriva d.o.o) that takes about 30 minutes to the city center.

=== Ticketing ===
Bus rides may be paid with the Urbana payment card (also used for the funicular) or with a mobile phone.

== Cycling ==
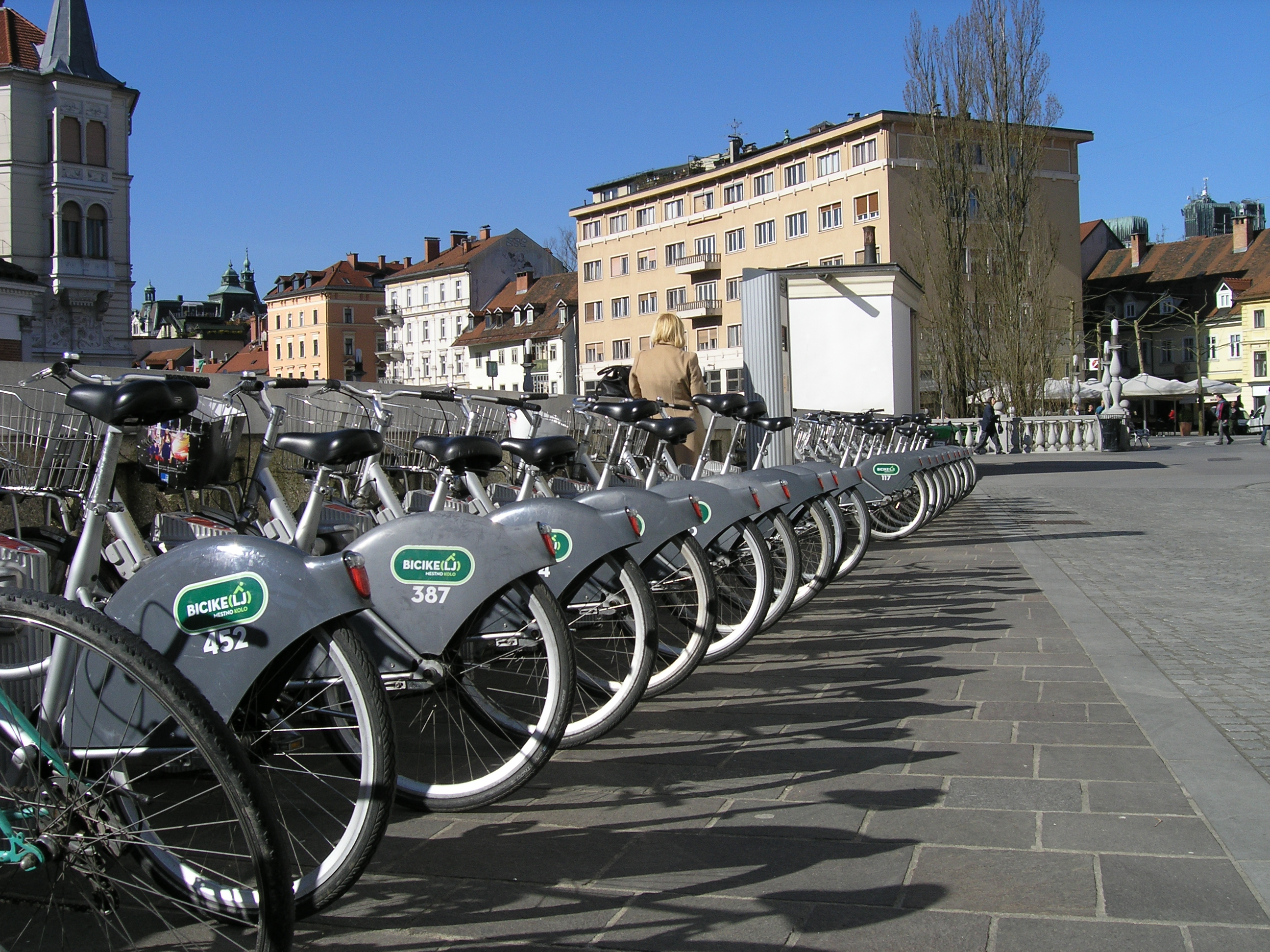
BicikeLJ, a Ljubljana-based self-service bicycle network, is free of charge for the first hour.

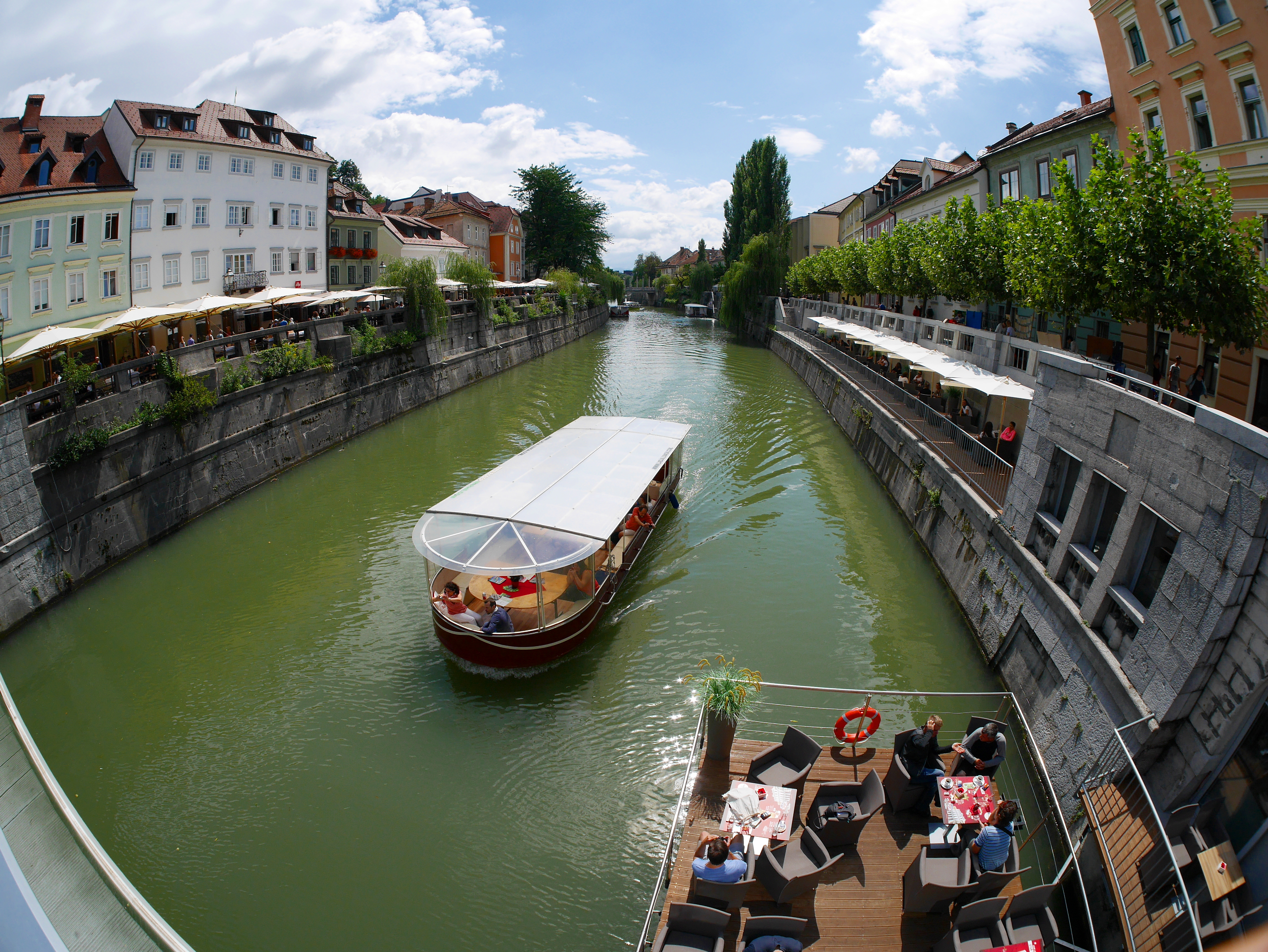
River boat

There is a considerable amount of bicycle traffic in Ljubljana, especially in the warmer months of the year. It is also possible to rent a bike. Since May 2011, the BicikeLJ, a self-service bicycle rental system offers the residents and visitors of Ljubljana 600 bicycles and more than 600 parking spots at 60 stations in the wider city centre area. The daily number of rentals is around 2,500. There was an option to rent a bike even before the establishment of BicikeLJ.

There are still some conditions for cyclists in Ljubljana that have been criticised, including cycle lanes in poor condition and constructed in a way that motorised traffic is privileged. There are also many one-way streets which therefore cannot be used as alternate routes so it is difficult to legally travel by bicycle through the city centre. Through years, some prohibitions have been partially abolished by marking cycle lanes on the pavement.

In 2015, Ljubljana placed 13th in a ranking of the world's most bicycle-friendly cities. In 2016, Ljubljana was 8th on the Copenhagenize list.

== Water transport ==
The city only has access to rivers; Ljubljanica and the Sava. Both rivers were the main means of cargo transport to and from the city until the mid-19th century when railroads were eventually built.

Today, the Ljubljanica is used by a number of tourist boats, including a route on board a cruise barge, that takes passengers through the old town, through tranquil Špica, all the way to the legendary Dragon Bridge and next to the Ljubljana Castle. Holders of the Ljubljana Tourist Card can enjoy this experience free of charge.
