= TecTile =

NFC application developed by Samsung for use with smartphones

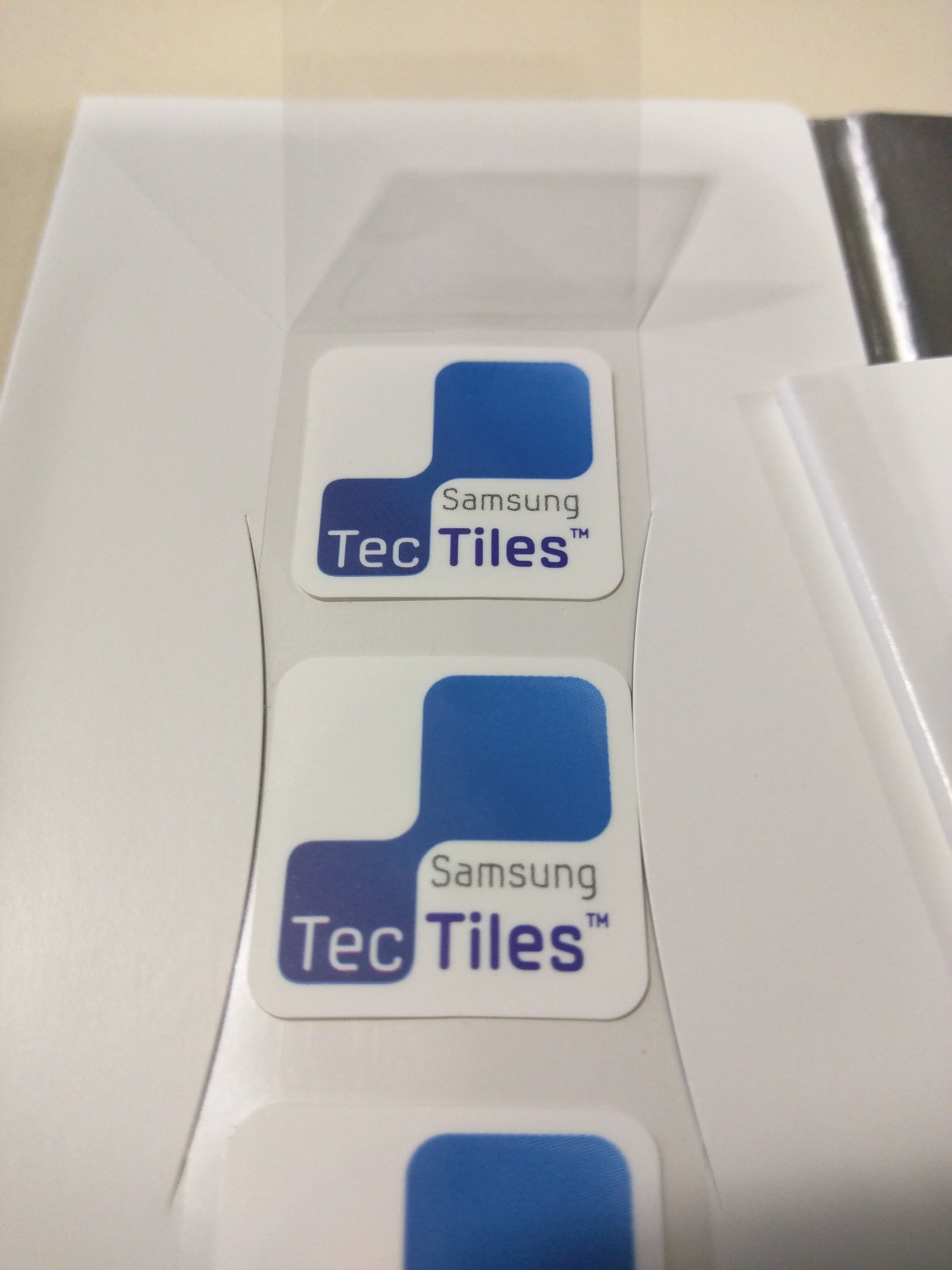
TecTiles NFC tags

Galaxy SIII and a pair of TecTile stickers

TecTiles are a near-field communication (NFC) application, developed by Samsung, for use with mobile smartphone devices.

Each TecTile is a low-cost self-adhesive sticker with an embedded NFC transponder (NFC tag). They are programmed before use, which can be done simply by the user, using a downloadable Android app.

When an NFC-capable phone is placed or tapped on a tag, the programmed action is undertaken. This could cause a website to be displayed, the phone switched to silent mode, or many other possible actions.

NFC tags are an application of RFID technology. Unlike most RFID, which makes an effort to give a long reading range, NFC deliberately limits this range to only a few inches or almost touching the phone to the Tag. This is done deliberately so that tags have no effect on a phone unless there is a clear user action to trigger the tag. Although phones are usually touched to tags, this does not require any 'docking' or galvanic contact with the tag, so they are still considered to be a non-contact technology.

Although NFC tags can be used with many smartphones, TecTiles gained much prominence in late 2012 with the launch of the Galaxy SIII.

== Applications ==
Some applications are intended for customising the behaviour of a user's own phone according to a location, e.g. a quiet mode when placed on a bedside table; others are intended for public use, e.g. publicising web content about a location. (Note: This could be used to build a system similar to QRpedia.) This programming is carried out entirely on the tag. Subject to security settings, any compatible phone would have the same response when tapped on the tag. When the tag's response is a Facebook 'Like' or similar, this is carried out under the phone user's credentials (such as a Facebook identity), rather than the tag's identity.

Samsung groups tags' functions under four headings: Settings, Phone, Web and Social. A handful of examples:

Settings

- Enter 'quiet' or 'in-car' mode
- Set an alarm clock
- Launch an app
- Join a WiFi network. This could be used for giving convenient access to coffee shop networks.
- Show a message

Phone

- Make a call
- Send a text
- Share a contact vCard

Web

- Open a web page
- Show a location on a mapping service, such as Google Maps
- Check-in to Foursquare, or other location-based services.

Social

- Update Facebook status with a location
- 'Like' on Facebook
- Send a tweet
- Follow a Twitter user

Tags may also be pre-programmed and distributed to users. Such a tag could be set to take the user to a manufacturer's service support page and sent out stuck to washing machines or other domestic whitegoods. Factory-prepared tags can also be printed with logos, or moulded into forms apart from stickers, such as key fobs or wristbands.

== Lifespan ==
The re-programmability of a tag is claimed at over 100,000 programming cycles.

A tag placed on a doorway or noticeboard may be re-programmed in situ and could thus have a long life (e.g. many conferences, meetings or events). Tags may be locked after programming, to avoid unauthorized reprogramming. Locked tags may be unlocked only by the same phone that locked them.

The duration of a locked tag's relevance will be the main constraint on tag lifetime if unlocking is not possible. The lifespan of a tag is also likely to be limited by physical factors such as the glue adhesion, or the difficulty of peeling them from the glue.

== Compatibility ==
The TecTile app is not installed by default. If a tag is read before it is installed, the user is directed to the app download site.

Using a Samsung TecTile NFC tag requires a device with the MIFARE Classic chipset. This chipset is based on NXP's NFC controller, which is outside the NFC Forum's standard. Using a TecTile thus requires the NXP chipset. The NXP chipset is found in many Android phones. Recently Android phone manufacturers have chosen to drop TecTile support; notably in Samsung's latest flagship phone the Galaxy S4 and Google's Nexus 4. TecTiles also do not work with BlackBerry and Windows NFC phones. The new version of TecTile, called TecTile 2, have improved compatibility, but currently the Samsung Galaxy S4 is the only device that comes with native support for TecTile 2.

NFC tags that do comply with NFC Forum Type 1 or Type 2 compatibility protocols are much more widely compatible than the MIFARE dependant Samsung TecTile, and are also widely available. Popular standards-compliant NFC tags are the NTAG213 (137 bytes of usable memory), and the Topaz 512 (480 bytes of usable memory).

=== Tag encoding ===
The need for the installed app is one of the drawbacks to TecTile and to NFC tags in general. The basic NFC tag standards support tags carrying URLs, where the scheme or protocol (e.g. the http:// prefix) may be either http (for web addresses), tel for telephony, or an anonymous data scheme. Although support for the http and tel schemes may be assumed in a basic handset, support for the others will not be available unless an App has been installed and registered to handle them.

In general, NFC tags (in the non-TecTile sense) are only useful for web addresses and telephony.

To provide features beyond this, Samsung offers the TecTile App. This could have used any scheme on a tag, or even invented a whole new scheme. When installed, such an App would register itself to handle these new schemes. However the App is not part of the default install for a handset, even a Samsung. To allow users to install the App automatically, on first encountering a TecTile, all the TecTile's sophisticated and phone-specific features are still provided through the http scheme. The basic URL is that for initially downloading the App, details of the TecTile operation are encoded as URL parameters within the query string in addition to this.

When reading a tag, one of two things happens:

- On first reading a tag, without the App installed, the tag's http scheme takes the handset user to the App download site.
- On reading a tag with the App installed, the App recognises the download URL and suppresses the handset's usual web browsing behaviour. It then use the query string embedded within the URL to instead activate the TecTile function requested.

This convoluted behaviour was chosen to make the App effectively self-installing for naive users. Why the App was not supplied as default is unknown. The downsides of this design choice though are that the URLs required to activate TecTile functions are relatively long, meaning that non-TecTile NFC tags with limited memory size (137 bytes) cannot generally be used for functions other than web addresses. Additionally, the lack of a non-proprietary approach to these more capable functions limits the development of NFC tags as a general technique across all such handsets, rather than just Samsung TecTiles.

== Similar tag technologies ==
- iButton, an early single-contact based system
- Touchatag, an RFID-based system
- QR code, optically-read codes
