= T-mobilitat =

Smart card automated fare collection

- Card design
- Location: Barcelona metropolitan area
- Launched: 2022
- Technology: MIFARE DESFire
- Manager: Autoritat del Transport Metropolità
- Currency: EUR
- Stored-value: None
- Validity: Barcelona Metro; TMB-operated busses; Funicular de Montjuïc
- Website: t-mobilitat.atm.cat

T-mobilitat is a contactless smart card automated fare collection used for payment of fares on public transport in the Barcelona metropolitan area sponsored by Generalitat de Catalunya. On January 1, 2022, the first phase of the project launched after six years of delays.
