= BicikeLJ =

Public bicycle rental program in the city of Ljubljana, Slovenia

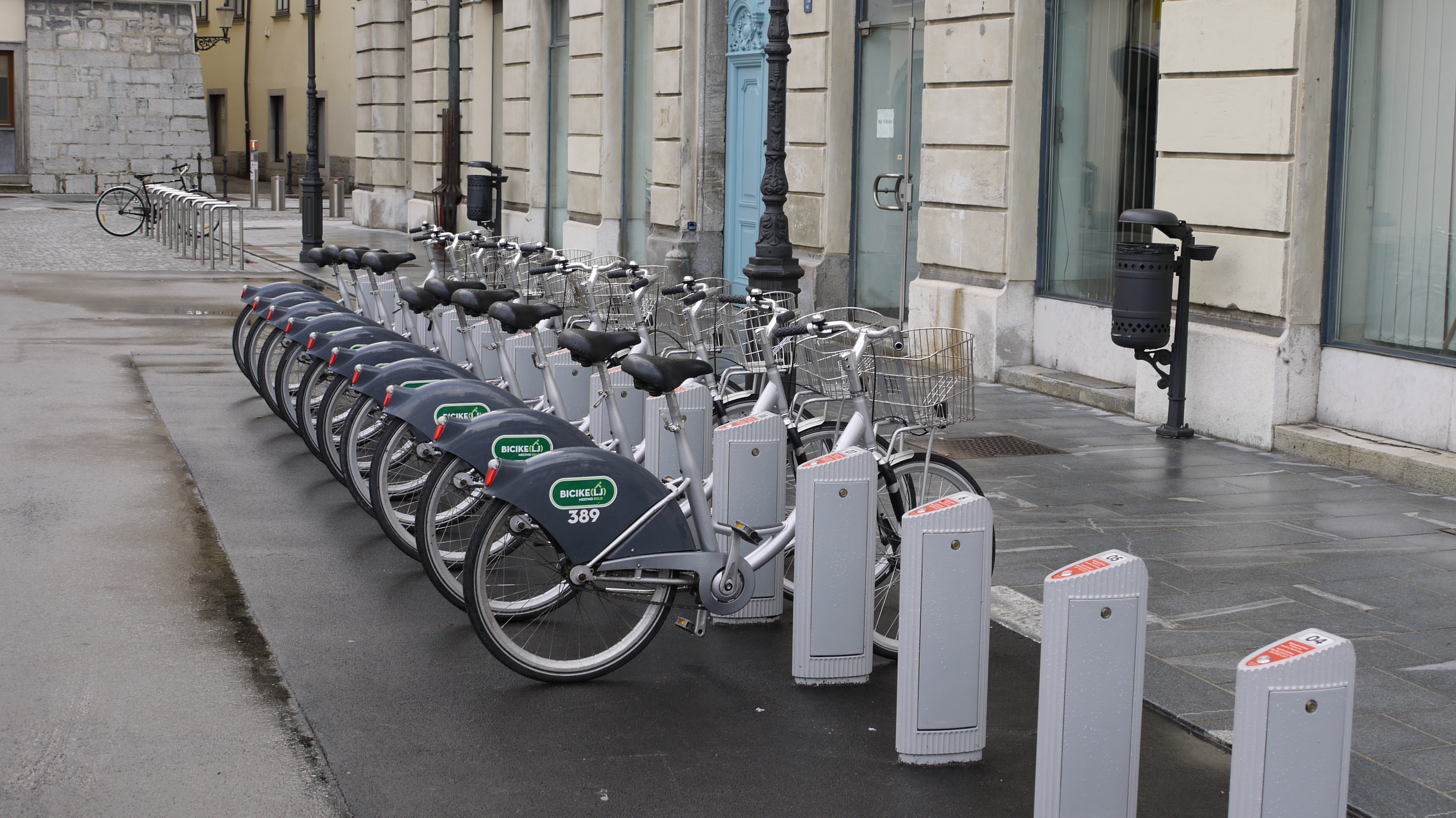
Bicikelj station

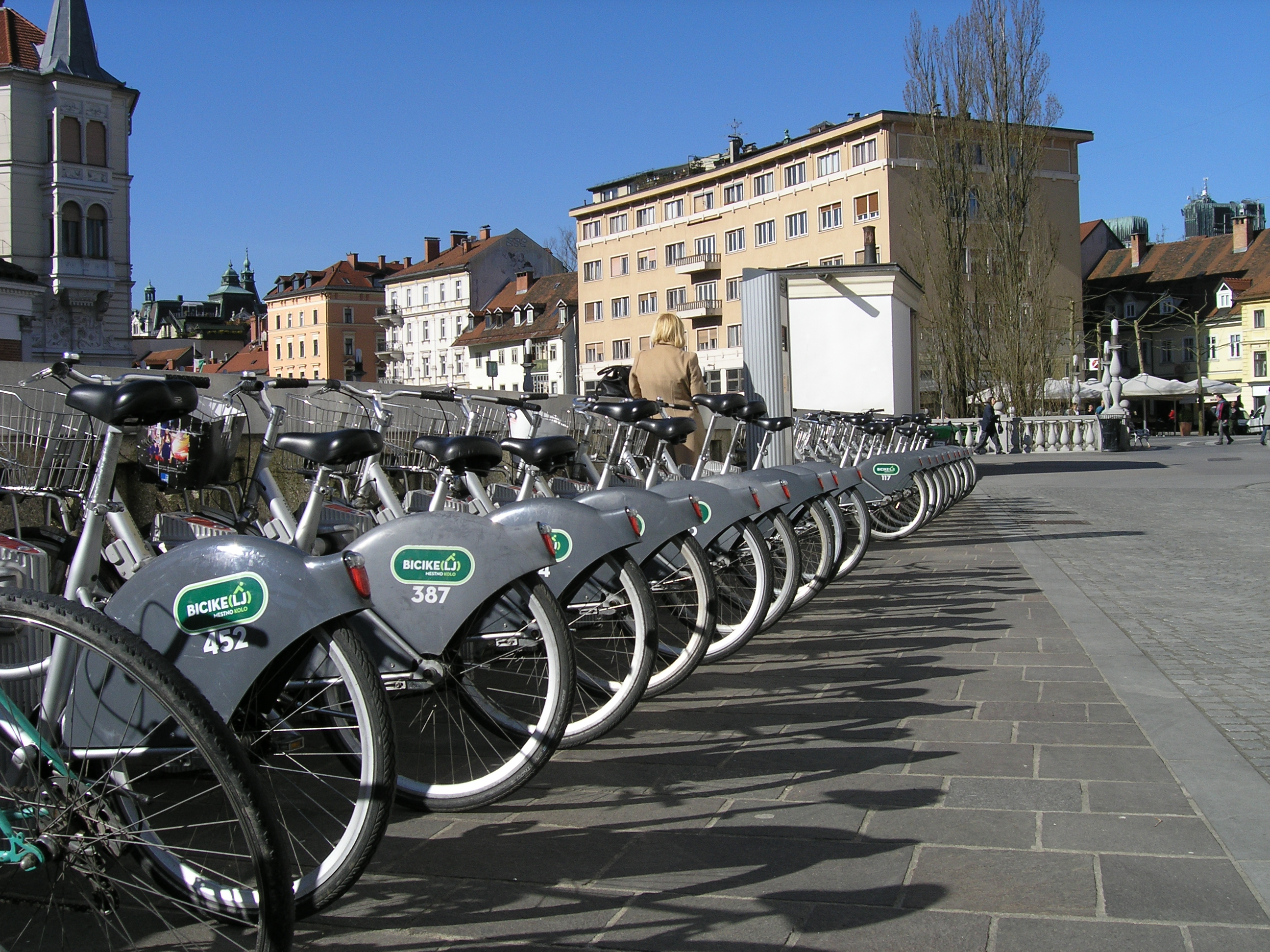
BicikeLJ station in Ljubljana city center

Bicikelj is a public bicycle rental program in the city of Ljubljana, Slovenia that was started in 2011. It is offered as public service by the City Municipality of Ljubljana and operated under concession by Europlakat. The system was provided by JCDecaux.

== System ==
As of 2022, the Bicikelj system consists of 840 bikes and 84 stations, 300 to 500 m away from each other. The stations are equipped with an automatic rental terminal for locking and unlocking approximately 20 bicycles each. The first 60 minutes of bike rental is free. After the first 60 minutes, the hourly rental rate for total hours beyond the first 60 minutes is debited from the user's bank account. However, bikes can be rented for free longer than one hour "serially" during a day if a minimum of three minutes has passed between the two free rides. The total number of free rides over the period of users' subscription is unlimited.

Short-term subscribers, such as tourists, pay only €1 for an on-line registration that is valid for one week. If the bike is not returned within 24 hours, the €350 deposit will be debited. Annual subscribers can rent the bikes over a one-year period for just €3 and are able to use the system with their Urbana public transit smart card and personal identification number.

== Statistics ==
Bikes were rented 1,717,389 times from the beginning of the program to 31 December 2013, and 99% of the system's users did not exceed the free initial hour. The service reported in 2014 that each of its 300 bicycles are borrowed on average six times a day and that 10 percent of the population are regular users. By mid-June 2016, that number had risen to 3,445,030 of whom 98% did not exceed one hour. The average duration of a bike rental is 16 minutes. The highest number of rides per day recorded was on 4 October 2021, when 7,284 rides were recorded. In 2018 there were 1,094,144 bicycle rentals, compared to Vienna which had 1,005,992 rentals same year. In 2019 there were 1,139,738 bicycle rentals (+4.1% compared to 2018). Due to the COVID-19 pandemic in Slovenia, in 2020 there were only 777,117 rentals (–31.8 % compared to 2019). In 2023 number was set at 1,539,849 bicycle rentals.

== History ==
Over 16,200 users registered within two months after the system was introduced in 2011. In end of 2018 there were 37,000 active users. In end of July 2019 BicikeLJ had 180,831 accounts. In 2021 17 % of Ljubljana citizens have yearly subscription and almost 8 millions of rides were made.
