= Urbana (payment card) =

Smart card for public transport in Ljubljana

- Location: Ljubljana
- Launched: August 2009
- Manager: LPP
- Currency: EUR (€0 minimum load, €50 maximum load)
- Credit expiry: 5 years since last use
- Validity: Ljubljana Passenger Transport (LPP); Ljubljana Castle funicular; Ljubljana City Library; BicikeLJ; Public parking
- Retailed: Urbanomat; LPP sales stations; Newsagents; Tourist information center
- Variants: Stored-value card (yellow); Time-based pass (green)
- Website: Urbana - single city card

Urbana is a travel card used on public transport services in Ljubljana, the capital of Slovenia. It is a credit-card sized plastic card on which the customer electronically loads money and/or passes. It was introduced to enhance the technology of the public transportation system and eliminate the burden of carrying and collecting tokens or cash.

== Types ==
There are two types of Urbana single city card

=== Stored-value card (yellow) ===
Sold on all sales locations for €2 and is transferable. It can be reloaded with amount ranging from €0.05 to €50. Fare for a bus ride is €1.30 and is valid for 90 minutes from time of validation on the bus. It includes unlimited transfers within the 90 minutes. It is also possible to convert the card into a time-based pass, in which case name is printed on the back of the card and is not transferable anymore.

=== Time-based pass (green) ===
Sold only at Ljubljana Passenger Transport (LPP) sales stations and is issued to a specific holder. Monthly, semiannual, and annual passes can be loaded to the green Urbana card. The holder's name is printed on the back of the card. This type of card can also hold credit for paying services other than public transport, such as parking. If no pass is loaded on the card, the bus fare is deducted from credit that is on the card.

== Technology ==
Urbana is an RFID contactless smart card that utilises MIFARE DESFire EV1 technology by NXP Semiconductors. The green card contains holder's personal information and a unique 17-digit number. Upon touching the validator, the card's information is verified on a remote server which in return confirms or denies the transaction. Feedback on the validator is nearly instantaneous and informs the passenger whether the transaction was successful or not. If credit is used for the fare, the validator also displays previous and current balance.

== Usage ==
=== Topping up ===
Both the yellow and green Urbana cards can be topped up. They can be topped up at self-service machines called Urbanomats, LPP sales points, tourist information centers and newspapers agents.

==== Urbanomat ====
Urbanomat is an automated machine for buying and topping up Urbana payment cards. The machine accepts Maestro and MasterCard (but not Visa), banknotes and coins and does not return the change. It can also be used to check the balance of Urbana.

=== Buses ===
All passengers must enter the bus at the front (driver's) doors. There are two Urbana validator on every bus - one at the right hand side and the other on the left hand side, both at the front door. On newer buses, one validator is installed at the front door on the right, and the other is located in the middle of the bus on the right. The card must be touched in and the machine will produce a chime upon a successful validation.

One Urbana card can be used to pay for multiple passengers. In that case the driver must be notified about the number of passengers and then Urbana is placed to the reader and proper amount is deducted.

=== Library card ===
In June 2012, Urbana was introduced as the library card of Ljubljana City Library (Mestna knjižnica Ljubljana). It fully replaced old library cards by March 2013. Both types of Urbana can be used for library membership. When registering for membership, a member ID number is printed to the back of the card. If the yellow card is used, member's name is also added to the back of the card, however the card is still transferable for use on the buses.

=== Other uses ===
The Urbana payment card is used also for the payment of rides with the Ljubljana Castle funicular, using BicikeLJ, the city's bicycle-sharing system, and paying for parking at Ljubljana's parking facilities. The planned uses are also for paying entry fees to museums and cultural events.
