= Synchronous Serial Port =

Serial port

A Synchronous Serial Port (SSP) is a hardware controller commonly found in microcontrollers that provides support for synchronous serial communication protocols depending on the specific implementation. An SSP can operate in either master or slave mode, following a master–slave communication paradigm in which the master device provides the clock signal and coordinates data transfer across the bus.

This hardware commonly supports one of are two widely used protocols Inter-Integrated circuit (I^{2}C) and the Serial Peripheral Interface (SPI).

== See also ==
- Serial Peripheral Interface Bus
- Inter-Integrated circuit
