= Ascom B8050 Quickfare =

Ascom B8050 "QuickFare"
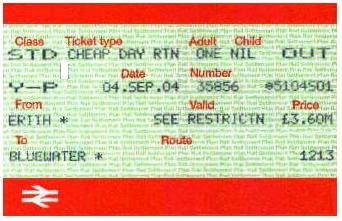

System information
- Full name: Ascom B8050
- Machine type: Self-service machine
- Type of ticket stock: Continuous roll
- Manufacturer: Ascom Autelca AG, Bern, Switzerland

History
- First introduced: 1989; 36 years ago
- Machine number range: (Numbers not shown on tickets)
- Window number range: Upwards from 01
- Machines in use: Approximately 60

Locations/areas/train operating companies
- Current users: Island Line Trains; Northern Rail; Silverlink
- Former users: All TOCs operating in the former Network SouthEast area TOCs in some other urban areas First Capital Connect; First Great Western

Ascom B8050, usually known by the name QuickFare, is an early example of a passenger-operated railway ticket issuing system, consisting of a series of broadly identical machines installed at British railway stations from 1989 onwards. The machines allow passengers to buy the most popular types of ticket themselves, without having to go to a booking office, and are therefore useful at unstaffed, partly staffed or busy stations. All QuickFare machines have been replaced by more modern technology.

== Origins ==
The system had its origins in various rudimentary computer-based systems developed for British Rail in the early and mid-1980s, both by Ascom Autelca and by other companies. These were classified by British Rail under the general acronym POTIS (Passenger Operated Ticket Issuing System).

- Ascom Autelca developed the Agiticket B100 in 1983; this was used for a short time at London Charing Cross
- Crouzet (manufacturers of the ticket machines on the Tyne & Wear Metro, and the system used until recently on the Glasgow Subway) supplied some machines for trial in 1987
- Westinghouse did the same in 1987
- Thorn EMI, makers of the APTIS and PORTIS/SPORTIS systems, tried out a passenger-operated equivalent in 1989

Illustrations of these early tickets

The tickets were printed on simple card stock with no magnetic stripe on the reverse - so data was merely printed on the front, not separately encoded as well.

Autelca AG developed the B8011 and B8020 machines from the B100 Agiticket. A wider range of tickets could be purchased from these: a row of 32 buttons was programmed with various combinations of destination and ticket type (for example, "Child Single to Gatwick Airport" or "Adult Cheap Day Return to Brighton"). Coins were inserted by the passenger after the appropriate button was pressed, and tickets and change were collected from a hatch at the bottom. A separate button could be pressed to cancel the transaction at any stage. Many of these features were carried forward to the B8050 machine.

A B8011 ticket
A B8011 machine, showing many similarities to the B8050

The B100 machine was the intermediate stage between the B8011/B8020 (which were essentially identical) and the B8050. Although most were found in the former Network SouthEast (NSE) area, a few persisted in urban areas elsewhere in England until around 2000. Such machines are believed to have been moved from NSE stations when they were supplanted by B8050s, being reprogrammed with different destination and fare information accordingly. A B100 ticket

== Introduction of the B8050 ==
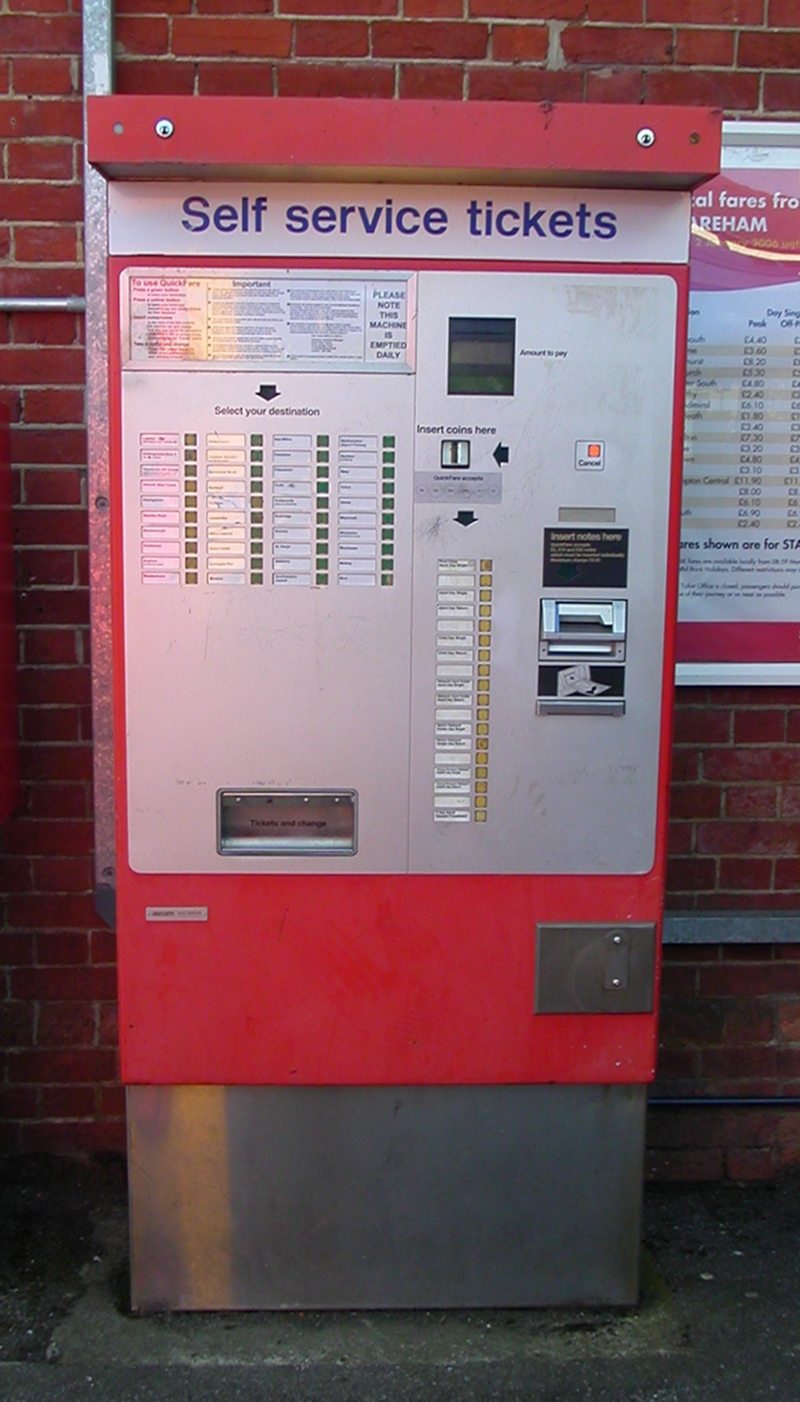
A "QuickFare" machine at Wareham in Dorset. This is the version with a more limited range of destinations, selected from the 40 green buttons in the centre.

After the B8050 was developed, it was chosen by the Network SouthEast sector of British Rail as the standard self-service ticket issuing system. There were 2 variants of the B8050 machine which had either 40 or 92 destination buttons. It was decided that a large number of machines should be provided, with almost every station having at least one and major commuter and terminal stations having many. The following stations, for example, had at least eight separate machines at some point - in some cases, for many years:

Machines	Station
16	London Victoria
10	London Liverpool Street
10	London Waterloo
10	Wimbledon
9	Reading
8	London Cannon Street
8	London Paddington
8	Walthamstow Central

Existing B100 machines at NSE stations were replaced on a rolling basis between 1990 and 1994. In some cases, usually for a short time only, both types of machine would be in place simultaneously at a given station.

== Details of the machine ==
B8050 machines offer a wider range of journey combinations than their predecessors, as they have separate sets of buttons for destinations and ticket types. A set of machines was produced with 92 destination buttons, arranged in four columns of 23, and 18 ticket type buttons in a single column. Another set of machines was manufactured with a restricted set of destination buttons (40, in four columns of ten) but the same 18 ticket type buttons. In all cases, a "Cancel" button is available as well. Destination buttons are green, while those for the ticket type are yellow and the "Cancel" button is red.

=== Ticket stock ===
Tickets are credit-card sized with square corners. They are printed on a continuous roll of ticket stock, which is aligned within the machine by way of a rectangular notch a quarter of the way down each ticket on the left-hand side. The machine cuts off each individual ticket from the roll after the printing process finishes, after which they drop into a large plastic-fronted hatch at the bottom (along with any change).

The tickets have orange bands at the top and bottom, in common with the stock used for travel tickets in other British railway ticket issuing systems. In British Rail days, they were identified by batch reference BR 3595/3; this changed to RSP 3595/3 after privatisation, following the creation of Rail Settlement Plan Ltd to administer the ticketing and revenue allocation systems of the post-privatisation rail network. Machines on the South West Trains network sometimes use stock with reference RSP 3595/30; a VAT number is printed on the reverse of these, above the batch reference.

=== Destinations ===
Before the machine or machines at a given station were installed, an analysis was undertaken of the most popular destinations for tickets bought from that station (or, strictly speaking, tickets issued with that station as an origin point - encompassing tickets bought at the station's ticket office, if applicable; those issued on trains by conductors using SPORTIS machines; and those issued remotely). It is believed that these statistics were used in conjunction with a more long-term forecast of the most likely destinations passengers would choose, in order to establish a set of destinations to be programmed into the machine. It was not straightforward to delete, add or change destinations once they had been set: as well as the manual reprogramming required, the station names were displayed to the passenger in the form of sheets of paper pre-printed with the relevant names and aligned (behind clear plastic panels) with the buttons. These had to be reprinted whenever any details changed. As a result, it was relatively rare for the range of destinations to change.

At most stations, the range provided was largely appropriate, with all nearby stations and more distant larger places being available. There was usually a reasonable balance between places served by regular direct train services and more "unusual" locations. However, this was not always the case: a notable example was Portslade, near Brighton, which offered Wimbledon, more than 50 miles and at least one change of train away, but not Fishersgate - the next stop.

At many Thameslink stations north of London (West Hampstead Thameslink to Bedford), the machines were installed with many destinations in the Catford/Bromley South/Orpington areas of south-east London, because at the time these places were served by direct Thameslink services running via the Catford Loop Line. Soon afterwards, in the early 1990s, the Thameslink service pattern was considerably altered, with services south of London being concentrated on south-west London and Surrey in addition to the Brighton Main Line. Machines at affected stations were not updated with more appropriate destinations (such as Sutton), and retained the incongruous south-east London destinations until the removal of the machines in late 2006.

All stations in the Network SouthEast area offered the London "station group" and the One Day Travelcard. Many also featured Gatwick Airport - an important destination throughout the year, with a larger proportion of journeys than usual happening at times such as very early morning or late evening, when booking offices are more likely to be shut.

=== Ticket types ===
Eighteen "ticket type" buttons were provided on all machines at the time of manufacture, but in most cases a number of those have been left blank and non-functioning, albeit with the ability to be programmed with a "ticket type" if necessary. Typical combinations available are:

- First Class Adult Day Single
- Standard Class Adult Day Single
- Standard Class Adult Day Return
- Standard Class Child Day Single
- Standard Class Child Day Return
- Young Persons Railcard holder Day Single
- Young Persons Railcard holder Day Return
- Senior Railcard holder Day Single
- Senior Railcard holder Day Return
- Network Railcard holder Day Single
- Network Railcard holder Day Return
- Seven Day Season Ticket (as mentioned below)

Machines are time-sensitive. Thus, all Day Return buttons issue a Cheap Day Return (reduced-fare off-peak ticket) at the appropriate times of day; and tickets with Railcard discounts do not become available until the time from which the Railcard is valid. Messages concerning the validity or otherwise of tickets appear in a green LCD panel below the "Amount to pay" display.

=== Other tickets ===
All machines offer Seven Day Season Tickets, printed on separate dedicated ticket stock (batch reference BR 3595/4, and later RSP 3595/4) with dark green upper and lower bands, a white box in which "SEASON" or "TRAVELCARD" would be printed by the machine, and an area for the passenger's Photocard number to be entered manually. Because the machines take cash only and Season Tickets are expensive compared to ordinary travel tickets, it is relatively unusual to see an issued Season Ticket.

In addition, some machines have buttons (usually in the "destinations" section) for one or more of the following:

- Daily and/or weekly car park tickets
- Platform tickets (rare, and mostly in the early years)
- The Greater Manchester Rail Ranger, a one-day multi-journey ticket for use in the GMPTE area (at Manchester area machines)

Receipts are not issued in any format.

=== Remaining machines ===
There are very few Ascom B8050 QuickFare machines left on the National Rail network. There are at least three machines still in use by Island Line Trains, on the Isle of Wight, at Ryde Pier Head, Ryde Esplanade and Shanklin. One at the back entrance to Birmingham New Street station, that had been out-of-use for at least a year, was eventually removed in February 2009.
