= Family and Friends Railcard =

British rail discount scheme

The Family and Friends Railcard is an annual rail travel discount card for use in Great Britain by adults travelling with at least one child. Cards valid for either one or three years can be purchased at a cost of £35 for one year or £80 for three. It is one of the discounted and concessionary fare schemes available on Britain's railway network to people who either belong to particular groups or who are willing to buy tickets ahead of the date of travel. Before 18 May 2008 it was known as the Family Railcard, but the name was changed to reflect the fact that discounted travel is not restricted to adults and children who are related.

== History ==
Following the introduction of the Young Persons Railcard and Senior Railcard earlier in the 1970s, and the implementation throughout that decade of a wide range of short-term promotional fares and other offers for children travelling with adults, British Rail announced at the beginning of 1979 that they intended to introduce a new Railcard to give permanent discounts for adult-and-child groups. The original plan was for a £4.00 "one-adult" card—this would give no discount for the Railcard holder, but up to four accompanying children would be able to travel for £0.50 each on various off-peak tickets—and a £9.00 "two-adult" card, on which a second adult could be named; they would also pay £0.50 when travelling with the first named adult. In both cases, the Railcard holder would need a British Rail "Photocard" (numbered photographic identity card). The intended launch date was 1 May 1979.

When the scheme was introduced on an experimental basis on 17 June 1979, there was only one change from the proposals: the prices of the single-holder and joint-holder Railcards were set at £5.00 and £10.00 respectively. As from 1 March 1980, the Railcard became a permanent scheme. Also at this point, the prices rose to £8.00 and £16.00 respectively, and on the joint-holder card, the minimum age for the second named holder was lowered from 18 to 14 (before being raised to 16, British Rail's standard transition age from child to adult status, on 29 November 1981). At this stage, Railcards were issued with an expiry date, rather than being valid from their date of issue for a specific length of time. In connection with this, for a period during late 1980, both cards were reduced in price to £5.00, as they were only valid until 28 February 1981.

A series of major changes were made on 1 February 1981. The new version of the Railcard became valid for either one or two adults, with no distinction in price—so the separate "joint-holder Railcard" ceased to exist. The price was changed to £10.00; the Railcard holder now gained a discount of 50% on off-peak fares; the child flat fare became £1.00; and two other adults (in addition to the holder/s) could travel in the group for half fare. Other than a price rise in 1983, and some discounts on Motorail services, Sealink ferry services to the Channel Islands and rail-based holidays, the conditions remained the same until 1985.

The discount structure was changed on 12 May 1985, with Standard Day and Cheap Day Returns still receiving 50% off, but Standard Singles, Standard Returns (the equivalent of present-day Open tickets) and Saver tickets of all descriptions receiving a reduced discount of 34%. Child tickets of all types were still available at the £1.00 flat fare, however. Sealink discounts had been formalised and improved by this stage, with 50% discounts on Day Returns (34% discounts on other fares) to both the Channel Islands and the Isle of Wight; however, by the end of 1985, these had been altered again, with less substantial discounts being offered.

Discounts were further reduced in the next revision from 15 May 1990, with the Railcard being redesigned at the same time: the colour scheme was generally blue, with a pictorial background. Saver tickets, and the recently introduced Supersaver fares (lower-rate Savers), were now discounted by 25%; all other tickets received 34% off, including One Day Travelcards (with a minimum fare restriction). This was soon restricted to "All Zone" (1-6) Travelcards only. The Saver and Supersaver discount was cut again, to 20%, from 29 May 1994, at which point the child flat fare—which had been fixed at £1.00 since 1981—was raised to £2.00. Another redesign of the ticket stock happened at this point, with the predominant colour being brown. Meanwhile, as from 29 May 1995, the Railcard could be bought by anybody aged 16 and above. The previous lower age limit was 18, which was anomalous on two counts: for all other ticket-issuing purposes, people were considered adults from their 16th birthday onwards; and the lower limit for the second named holder (where applicable) had been 16 since 1981.

=== 2000 change and effect on child fares ===
The most recent change involving the discount structure happened as from 29 May 2000, and involved the introduction of another new ticket stock with a changed logo, red upper band and new form number^{A} (RSP 4599/253; all previous APTIS Family Railcards had used BR 4599/19, or RSP 4599/19 after privatisation.) All adult fares received a 34% discount, representing an improvement in respect of Saver and Supersaver fares; but the child discount was amended from a flat fare of £2.00 to a 60% discount on the full child fare (equivalent to an 81% discount on the full adult fare). This was subject to a £1.00 minimum fare. These conditions and discounts remain in place as of 2007.

The effect on child fares has been to make shorter (and lower-priced) journeys cheaper, but longer journeys more expensive. The "pivot point", where the child fare with the new version of the Railcard is the same as it was under "flat fare" conditions, occurs where the adult fare for a journey is £10.50, as shown in these examples:

Adult fare...	...81% discount...	...Child fare
£3.00	Min. fare applies	£1.00
£6.00	× 0.19 =	£1.15
£10.00	× 0.19 =	£1.90
£10.50	× 0.19 =	£2.00
£20.00	× 0.19 =	£3.80
£30.00	× 0.19 =	£5.70

=== 2008 changes ===
On 18 May 2008, the first stage of a two-part change to simplify Britain's rail fare structure was implemented. At the same time, the names of two Railcards were changed: the Young Persons Railcard became the 16-25 Railcard, and the Family Railcard was rebranded Family and Friends Railcard. This reflects the fact that non-family members may use the card and obtain discounts. Travelling conditions were also relaxed from this date: up four adults and four children can now travel together regardless of whether there is only one, or two, named cardholders present.

== Tickets issued with a Railcard ==
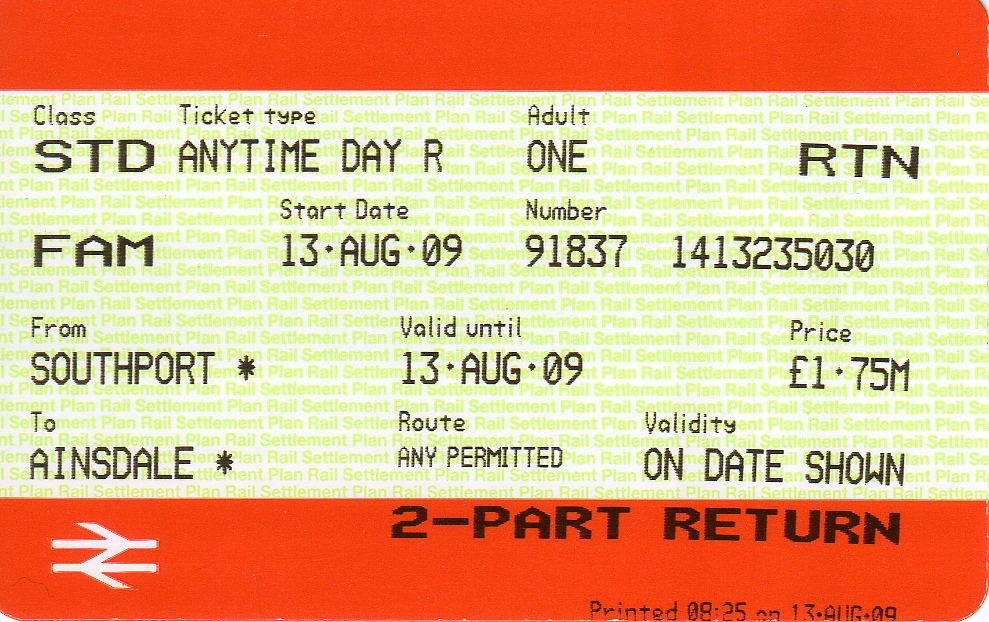
An adult railway ticket bought with a Family & Friends Railcard. Note the FAM code in the top left

On the APTIS, PORTIS/SPORTIS and other computerised ticket issuing systems, a "status code" field is provided on each ticket issued. This is left blank if an adult is travelling at full (undiscounted) fare; but if any discount or other special condition applies, a code of up to five letters appears.

Since the introduction of the APTIS and PORTIS systems in 1986, an adult ticket bought with a Family Railcard has always been identified with the code FAM. This has continued since the introduction of various "New Generation" systems that have superseded these. The code used for child tickets has varied, however. Usually, CHFAM is used; but during some of the changeover periods between different versions of the Railcard, FAMCH has been used as well. In these circumstances, one code has been used for tickets issued against the "original" Railcard, and the other has been used for those issued with the "new" version. CHFAM was used exclusively again once all of the "original" Railcards had expired. This happened after both the 1990 and the 2000 changes to the Railcard conditions.

== Definition of child fares ==
For ticket-issuing purposes, British Rail defined a child as being between five years old and one day short of 16 years old. This definition has been maintained since privatisation. Children under five are allowed free travel, provided that they do not occupy reserved seats and that no more than two (in British Rail days, four) accompany each fare-paying adult. The sole exception to this occurs with the Family Railcard: if a Railcard holder is travelling with one or more children under the age of five, and the combination of Railcard-discounted adult fare plus Railcard-discounted child fare(s) is cheaper than the full (non-discounted) adult fare, the Railcard holder may buy discounted tickets for the group, as if the children were actually five or older.

Where children turn 16 during the validity of a Railcard, they may still travel at the child fare until it expires.

== Applications ==
Railcards can be bought at railway station ticket offices; Rail Appointed Travel Agencies; by post from an agency at Harrington Dock, Liverpool (this option was available by 1993, and possibly earlier; the agency was originally set up in 1989 for Senior Railcards); through train operating company telesales facilities; and online at a website accessed via ATOC's "Railcards" website. Railcards bought online are sent by post.

== Price ==
The price of the Railcard has increased over time:

Effective from	Single-holder railcard	Joint-holder railcard
17 June 1979	£5.00	£10.00
1 March 1980	£8.00	£16.00
1 February 1981	£10.00	£10.00
19 June 1983	£12.00	£12.00
12 January 1986	£15.00	£15.00
May 1989	£20.00	£20.00
Early 2008	£24.00	£24.00
17 May 2009	£26.00	£26.00
28 May 2011	£28.00	£28.00
19 May 2013	£30.00	£30.00
2 March 2025	£35.00	£35.00

As from 1 February 1981, dedicated joint-holder railcards were withdrawn; and either one or two names could be shown on a railcard, with no price difference.

== Popularity ==
In 2000, approximately 300,000 Railcards were in use. 2.9 million journeys using the Railcard were made per year at that stage.

== Notes ==
^{A} Form numbers are codes introduced by British Rail to classify and catalogue all printed material: documents, tickets, wage slips, notepaper, parcels labels and hundreds of other items. Form numbers consist of a primary code and, often, a sub-code, separated by /. APTIS tickets used primary code 4599 in British Rail days; this changed to 7599 on post-privatisation "RSP" tickets. Other primary codes have since been introduced on Rail Settlement Plan ticket stock for New Generation (post-APTIS) ticket issuing systems.
