= Railfuture =

UK railway advocacy group

- Founded: 1978 (One predecessor founded 1951)
- Purpose: Transport
- Location: 3 Chandos Court, Martlesham, Suffolk IP12 4SU
- Region served: United Kingdom
- Method: Political advocacy
- Website: www.railfuture.org.uk
- Formerly called: Railway Development Society

Railfuture (formerly the Railway Development Society) is a UK advocacy group which promotes better rail services for passengers and freight across a bigger rail network. The group's national policies are determined by its national board of directors (one-third elected by the membership every year, for a three-year term) and its national AGM. The group's campaigns are pursued nationally by three policy groups (Passenger, Infrastructure & Networks, Freight) and locally through regional branches (12 in England, plus one each in Wales and Scotland). Its honorary president is Christian Wolmar, a transport writer and broadcaster. Its vice-presidents include former rail industry leaders Ian Brown CBE, Chris Green, and Stewart Palmer, and leading commentators such as Roger Ford of Modern Railways and fellow columnist Alan Williams.

Railfuture's opinions and campaigns receive coverage in the UK press, including national, regional, and rail publications. It has been mentioned in both houses of Parliament, and transport unions and international press also cite its reports and follow its actions. It claims to have 20,000 affiliated and individual members.

== History ==
The Railway Development Society (RDS) was preceded by the Society for the Reinvigoration of Unremunerative Branch Lines (UK) [SRUBLUK] founded in 1951 and which became the simpler-sounding Railway Invigoration Society (RIS). The RIS and the Railway Development Association (RDA, founded 1951) merged in 1978 to become the RDS. A founding member of the RDA was poet and rail enthusiast Sir John Betjeman.

One of the society's main campaign points was the retention of railway lines threatened with closure, and now the reopening of closed lines and stations. Campaigns with successful outcomes include the saving of the Settle–Carlisle line in the 1980s, improvements to the Oxford–Bicester line, and the reopening of the Borders Railway.

Additionally, Railfuture publishes proposals for entirely new rail schemes. One such is Thameslink 2, an additional north-south route cross-London route, connecting the Brighton Main Line to routes north of London, via East Croydon, Lewisham, Canary Wharf, and Stratford.

== Structure ==
The group has an elected national Board of Directors, and twelve English regional branches, plus Railfuture Scotland and Railfuture Wales.

=== Initiatives ===
The organisation has campaigned a reworking of concessionary fares on the British railway network by the introduction of a uniform "National Railcard" scheme to replace the railcards including the 16–25 Railcard, Network Railcard and Senior Railcard. Such a card was envisaged to take a similar form to existing BahnCard products offered by Deutsche Bahn in Germany. In April 2003, a study undertaken jointly by Railfuture and the Rail Passengers Council (later "Passenger Focus") stated that three million rail travellers might buy such a railcard if it were priced at £20.00, and offered a one-third discount for off-peak travel.

Other work has included advice on access for disabled passengers, such as in Gloucestershire.

=== Collaboration ===
Railfuture is a member of the European Passenger Federation.

=== Publications ===
Railwatch is a magazine published by Railfuture four times per year.

== Bibliography ==
- Allen, G. Freeman (1966). British Railways after Beeching. Shepperton: Ian Allan.
