= Two Together Railcard =

British rail discount scheme

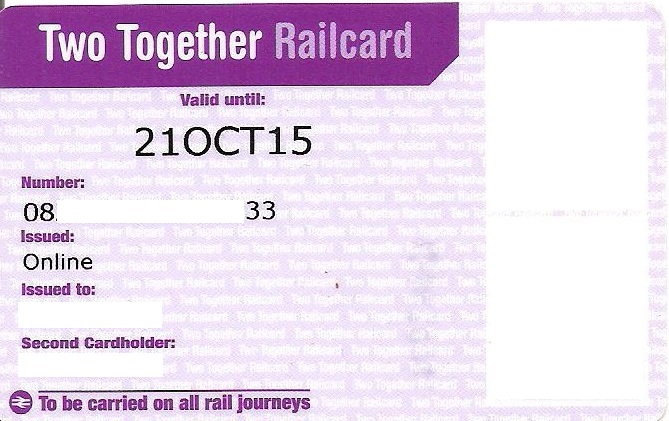
Two Together Railcard (online issue)

The Two Together Railcard is a scheme which gives discounts on certain types of railway ticket in Britain. Launched nationally in 2014 after a successful trial in 2011–12, it was the first new Railcard scheme since the 1980s. It is available to any two named individuals aged 16 or over and is priced at £35.00 (as of March 2025). There is no restriction on the number of times the Railcard can be used to purchase discounted tickets during the period of its validity, and there are no geographical restrictions on its use.

== History ==
A public trial version of the Railcard was launched on 5 September 2011. It cost £28.00 and could only be purchased at stations in the West Midlands region (the Birmingham, Coventry, Dudley, Walsall and Wolverhampton postcode areas). The trial lasted until 19 May 2012 and was instigated by the Association of Train Operating Companies (ATOC), which gathered feedback and undertook research into its effectiveness.

The Railcard was launched nationally on 3 March 2014 at a cost of £30.00, although for the first six months a 10% discount was given if it was bought online and a promotional code was quoted. The Two Together Railcard was the first new Railcard scheme to be launched for more than 30 years. The scheme was similar to British Rail's "Voyager" Railcard, which was sold for a few years in the 1980s and which was only available to purchase by post.

== Details ==
The card offers a discount of 1/3 of the price of train tickets but cannot be used on morning peak time journeys, defined as those between 0430 and 0929. The discount applies to First Class and Standard Class fares, including advance purchase tickets. The card is only valid for use on journeys where both named cardholders are present and both purchase a ticket for the same journey. It is primarily aimed at encouraging couples to travel by train instead of by car (when travelling as a pair, because the cost of fuel can be split between the two people the cost of two train tickets would typically be more expensive). Larger groups travelling by train may already be covered by the GroupSave discount.

Railcards can be issued online or at railway station ticket offices. They are mostly purple in colour and have passport-sized photographs of both cardholders on the front (the trial version had a separate Photocard).

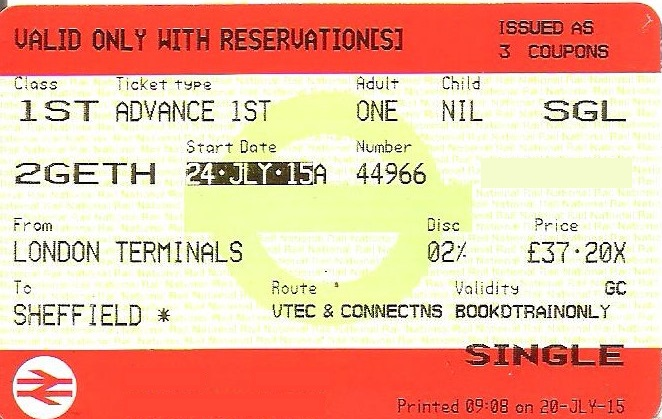
Ticket with two together railcard code

On the APTIS, PORTIS/SPORTIS and other computerised ticket issuing systems, a "status code" field is provided on each ticket issued. This is left blank if an adult is travelling at full (undiscounted) fare; but if any discount or other special condition applies, a code of up to five letters appears. The status code 2GETH is used to identify a ticket bought with a Two Together Railcard.

== Sales and usage ==
In the first year since its launch, over 215,000 Two Together Railcards have been sold with the average user saving £127.48 over the card's one-year validity period.

== See also ==
- UK concessionary fares and Railcards
