= Concessionary fares on the British railway network =

Fare schemes in United Kingdom

In addition to the large number and variety of short-term or localised promotional fares that have been available to passengers on the British railway network in recent decades (especially since privatisation), there are many permanent concessionary fare schemes available to passengers. Some of these take the form of Railcards, which can be purchased by people who qualify according to the conditions, and which give discounts for all journeys over a period; other concessions are available for individual journeys. As of 2025, the main Railcards include the 16–17 Saver, 16–25 Railcard, 26–30 Railcard, Senior Railcard, Disabled Persons Railcard, Family & Friends Railcard, Two Together Railcard, Network Railcard, and Veterans Railcard, with most priced at £35 for one year and the Disabled Persons Railcard at £20 for one year or £54 for three years.

In March 2025, the cost of most Railcards in England and Wales increased by £5 alongside a 4.6% rise in regulated fares, although the Disabled Persons Railcard was excluded from this increase. In Scotland, the Strathclyde Concessionary Travel Scheme was revised in April 2025, initially granting a 50% discount on standard single and return rail fares before changing in September 2025 to one-third off off-peak fares, with capped fares retained for rural zones and for ferry and subway travel. In all cases, details of the type of concession are printed on the passenger's travel ticket, to distinguish reduced-rate tickets from those sold at the standard full fare, and many concessions can now be verified digitally via mobile devices.

== Railcards ==
Before the rail network was privatised, British Rail introduced several discount cards that were available to certain groups of people. Various reasons are usually cited:

- To encourage off-peak and leisure travel
- To provide greater access to rail services for low-income groups, creating a social benefit
- To generate new sources of income: certain groups of people may be encouraged to perform a modal switch to rail transport if given the benefit of cheaper fares

All of the schemes were retained after privatisation, despite some threats of abolition. By generating extra income at off-peak times when trains are generally less crowded, they offer a potential commercial benefit for the train operating companies (TOCs).

Participation in the Young Persons, Senior and Disabled Persons Railcard schemes is mandatory for all TOCs under their franchise agreements; the Family and HM Forces Railcard schemes are notionally voluntary, but all TOCs participate in them. For the Network Railcard, which has a restricted geographical area, all TOCs in the relevant area are members of the scheme and participate in it. The revenue applicable to each TOC from the use of each Railcard is calculated by the Rail Delivery Group (RDG), and voting rights and costs payable are attributed accordingly.

Seven percent of fare revenue is derived from travel using one of the Railcard schemes. This amounts to approximately £400 million, of which £60M is estimated by the RDG to be attributable entirely to the existence of the Railcards – if they were not available, journeys to a total value of £60M per year would not be made by rail. Approximately 2,200,000 Railcards are in use at any one time in Britain.

=== 16-17 Saver ===
The 16–17 Saver was introduced in 2019 in order to allow people aged 16 and 17 to access child fares, which are normally only available to children under 16. The railcard costs £35.00 for a year (or until the holder's 18th birthday, whichever is sooner), and offers up to 50% off rail fares, the same as child rate tickets. However, the 16–17 saver cannot be used on journeys involving ScotRail and Caledonian Sleeper as Scotland has its own equivalent, the Young Scots Card. Unlike the 16–25 Railcard, the 16–17 Saver can be used to purchase season tickets but cannot be used to purchase first class tickets, and has no minimum fare. Only people aged 16 and 17 can use the railcard; 16–17 Savers purchased less than a year before the holder turns 18 will only be valid until the holder's 18th birthday instead of for a full year. Applications must be supported by a valid form of ID, such as a passport, driving license, or national ID card, to prove the age of the applicant.

=== 16–25 Railcard (formerly Young Persons Railcard) ===
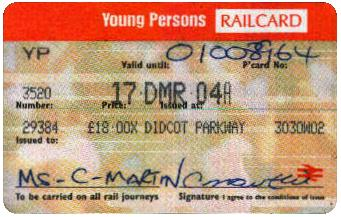
Young Persons Railcard issued in 2003.

This railcard costs £35.00, and is available to anybody between the ages of 16 and 25 (inclusive) - a person may purchase one the day before their 26th birthday and use it up to their 27th. Also, full-time students aged 26 or above may buy one. (In this instance, a "full-time student" is considered to be a person who studies at a "recognised educational establishment" for at least 15 hours per week and 20 weeks per year, or a person who holds an International Student Identity Card.) Employees of Rail Delivery Group accredited rail travel agents who pass the Certificate of Rail Agent Competency exam can claim a complimentary 16-25 Railcard without any age restrictions.

The standard discount on the full adult fare is 33.4% (changed from 34% in 2024), rounded down to the nearest £0.05; virtually all ticket types (although not season tickets) qualify for a discount. No discounts are available for accompanying children. In addition, a minimum fare applies before 10:00 Monday to Friday; this used to be £8.00 for a single ticket and discounted returns, and £16.00 for full-price return ticket types. However, from 17 May 2009 the minimum fare changed to £12 regardless of whether it was a single or a return ticket bought. During July and August the minimum fare rule does not apply.

=== 26–30 Railcard ===
Also known as the "Millennial Railcard", the 26–30 Railcard was announced in Philip Hammond's November 2017 United Kingdom budget speech. As an initial trial, the first 10,000 went on sale in March 2018 and sold out on the first day, the level of demand causing the website selling them to crash. They went on general sale on 2 January 2019, which again saw high demand.

Like the 16–25 Railcard, the 26–30 Railcard costs £35, confers a 33.4% discount, and can't be used for season tickets. It is the first digital-only railcard, stored on a smartphone app, with no paper version available.

=== Senior Railcard ===
This railcard costs £35.00, and is available to anybody aged 60 or over. Applications must be supported by a valid birth certificate, passport or driving licence confirming the applicant's age. Up to the early 1990s, up to four accompanying children could travel for £1.00 each, and the standard discount on the full adult fare was 50%. The railcard was known at that time as the Senior Citizen Railcard. In 1992, however, the "new" Senior Railcard was phased in; the standard discount became 34%, and there was no longer a discount for accompanying children. The discount is now 33.4%. Again, not all ticket types qualify for a discount. There are no time restrictions except in for journeys wholly within the Network Railcard area, where it cannot be used before 09:30. Certain county councils or other local authorities subsidise Senior Railcards for their residents.

=== Family and Friends Railcard ===
Formerly known as the family railcard, this railcard costs £35.00, and is available to anybody aged 16 or over. A second adult can be named as a co-holder. At least one adult (which must include one of the named holders) and one child must travel in order to receive the discounts, which are:

- Adult: 33.4% off the full adult fare
- Child: 60% off the full child fare, subject to a minimum fare of £1.00

The maximum group size is four adults and four children. One of the adults in the group must always be the cardholder (or the co-holder, in the case of a jointly-held railcard). Not all ticket types qualify for a discount.

=== Network Railcard ===
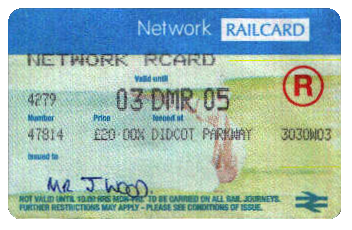
Recent version of the Network Railcard.

This railcard was introduced in 1986, when Network SouthEast was created. It gives a 34% discount on many (but again, not all) types of ticket within the Network SouthEast area. Similar to the Family Railcard, but without the requirement for a child to be travelling to obtain the discount, groups of up to four adults and four children may travel together and gain the following discounts:

- Adult: 34% off the full adult fare, subject to a minimum fare of £13.00 per ticket issued or £22.60 for travelcards. There is no minimum fare at weekends, or on bank holidays except for Travelcards which are subject to a £5 minimum fare.
- Child: 60% off the full child fare, subject to a minimum fare of £1.00 per ticket issued.

There have been various changes to the Network Railcard's conditions since 1986, and as with the Senior Railcard, a previous version existed under a different name (the Network Card). The current version costs £30.

=== Disabled Persons Railcard ===
This railcard was available in a one-year version for £14.00 until 5 September 2006 since then it has also been available in a 3-year version. As of September 2024 it currently costs:

- Valid for one year; £20.00
- Valid for three years; £54.00

The qualification criteria also changed slightly at this date. Disabled Persons Railcards are not issued at National Rail stations; they must be applied for by post or online.

=== HM Forces Railcard ===
These are available to all members of the regular armed forces, reservists, and in most cases the partners and dependent children of eligible members. Discounts for the railcard holder are generally 34% (subject to minimum fares), with Supersaver, Saver and Advance/SuperAdvance tickets discounted by 26%. Up to four accompanied children may travel at a 60% discount on the standard child fare, with a £1.00 minimum fare. HM Forces Railcards cost £19 and are distributed at a local level by the pay and administration offices at the member's unit.

=== Two Together Railcard ===
The Two Together Railcard offers a discount of one-third on most off-peak tickets nationwide, for two named individuals travelling together. During its trial period, which lasted from 5 September 2011 until 19 May 2012, the main applicant for a Two Together Railcard must live within the West Midlands area (postcodes beginning B, CV, DY, WS or WV).

In early 2014 National Rail began advertising the Two Together Railcard on posters at railway stations in central London. The Two Together Railcard was launched nationally on Monday 3 March 2014.

== Local railcards ==
The Network Railcard is the main example of a local railcard, but various others are available in much more localised areas, or even for a single line. In many cases, adult tickets are issued with the status code LOCRC (Local Railcard); child tickets show CHLOC. However, some of the Railcards have unique status codes assigned to them.

=== Cambrian Railcard ===
This costs £15.00 for a year. Cardholders must be aged 16 or over. A discount of 33% is available on Day Singles, Off-Peak Day Returns (formerly called "Cheap Day Returns"), Super Off-Peak (formerly "Supersaver") tickets on the Cambrian Coast route between Shrewsbury, Machynlleth, Aberystwyth, and Pwllheli. Up to two children can accompany the cardholder for a flat fare of £2.00 each. The Railcard can only be purchased at Shrewsbury, Welshpool, Machynlleth, Aberystwyth and Barmouth stations, and is only available to residents of the area.

=== Cotswold Line Railcard ===
This costs £12.50 for a year, and gives 33% discounts on Standard Day singles and Off-Peak Day singles (formerly "Cheap Day singles") and returns between Worcester Foregate Street and Oxford (and intermediate stops). Cardholders must be aged 16 or over, no co-holders can be named, and there are no discounts for accompanying adults or children. The Railcard can be bought at any staffed station on the route. The discount is not available until the 08.44 train from Worcester and the 08.48 train from Oxford on weekdays, but there are no weekend restrictions.

=== Dales Railcard ===
This was introduced in 1995, and after a trial period until 31 August 1995 when the price was set at £5.00, the cost settled at £10.00 per year for a number of years. There was a subsequent increase to £12.00 per year, but during 2007 a discounted price of £10.00 applies. The Railcard gives a discount of 34% on all Standard Day, Cheap Day and Saver tickets within the region of validity. This complex area covers:

- All journeys between the following stations (inclusive): Carlisle, Brampton, Gargrave and Wennington
- Journeys from all of these stations to all stations on the routes to Morecambe, Bradford Forster Square and Leeds (inclusive) - but not via Penrith
- Journeys from Skipton to all stations on the routes to Morecambe and Brampton (inclusive) - but not via Penrith

Cardholders must be aged 16 or over, and no co-holders can be named, but up to four accompanied children can travel at a 60% discount on the standard child fare (subject to a £1.00 minimum fare). (In the early years, up to two children could travel for a flat fare of £2.00.) Only residents in certain postcode areas within the region of validity may apply; however, an arrangement between the Friends of the Settle–Carlisle Line user group and train operator Northern Rail allows members of the group to buy a "Gold Card" (a plastic magnetic stripe card with an integrated circuit chip, rather than a printed paper card) giving them the same benefits as the railcard. This card costs £12.00.

=== Devon & Cornwall Railcard ===
This railcard, covering the counties of Devon and Cornwall, was introduced on 10 September 2006 to replace two Railcards which covered the counties separately: the Devon Railcard and the Cornish Railcard. It gives discounts for the holder (who must be aged 16 or over) and one accompanying adult of 34% on Cheap Day and Saver Singles and Returns for journeys wholly within the two counties, and 34% on the countywide Devon Day Ranger and Cornwall Day Ranger tickets, and line-specific Rangers for the following branch lines: Atlantic Coast Line, Looe Valley Line, Maritime Line, Tamar Valley Line and Tarka Line. The only exception is the St Ives Bay Line Day Ranger, which is discounted by 50% when the Railcard is used. Up to four children can accompany the adult(s) for a flat fare of £1.00 each for point-to-point tickets, or £2.00 for Day Rangers. While the array of discounts is broadly the same as those available with the Devon Railcard, the former Cornish Railcard offered 34% discounts on Standard Day Singles and Returns as well. These tickets were available for travel during the peak period (before 9.30am). This change prompted criticism that people who travelled frequently but not daily at peak times in Cornwall would have to pay more: although all season tickets for journeys within Cornwall were reduced in price from 10 September 2006, they are only cost-effective for regular travellers (four or five weekdays per week).

The original Cornish Railcard was one of the earliest examples of a local railcard, having been introduced on 4 November 1983. It originally cost £6.00 for adults, and there was a child version priced at £3.00. All journeys wholly within Cornwall (First and Second Class) were charged at half price, as were returns to Plymouth, just across the border into Devon. Some other offers for travel outside Cornwall were included until May 1984, at which point the Railcard was halved in price. By 1986, a 50% discount was only available on Cheap Day Returns; all other tickets received a 34% discount. Reduced-rate Seven Day Season Tickets could also now be bought by Railcard holders. Also, the price had increased to £7.00 (adults) and £3.50 (children). By 1989, another major change had taken place: only Cornwall residents could buy the Railcard; a Photocard (photographic identity card) was required; the Child version was withdrawn; Cheap Day Return discounts had been cut to 34%; the Tamar Valley Line (Plymouth–Gunnislake) was included in its entirety, although parts of it lie within Devon; and the design of the APTIS card (British Rail form number BR 4599/77) had changed significantly, now incorporating a stylised map of the Cornish peninsula and the railway lines serving the county.

=== Esk Valley Railcard ===
This costs £15.00 per year, and gives a discount of 33% on all Standard Day, Cheap Day and Saver tickets in the area of validity. This covers journeys between Whitby and Middlesbrough, and North Yorkshire Moors Railway trains between Whitby and Pickering. Cardholders must be aged 16 or over, and no co-holders can be named, but up to four accompanied children can travel at a 60% discount on the standard Child fare (subject to a £1.00 minimum fare). The Railcard is only available to residents living in the boroughs of Stockton-on-Tees, Middlesbrough and Redcar and Cleveland and the Hambleton, Scarborough and Ryedale districts of North Yorkshire. All revenue raised through the sale of these Railcards is used by the Esk Valley Railway Development Company, a not-for-profit organisation which runs the line as a "Community Railway", to maintain and improve the line.

=== Heart of Wales Line Railcard ===
Introduced in May 2000, this costs £15.00 for one year, and is available to residents aged 16 or over of certain postal districts along the line of the route, which runs from Swansea to Shrewsbury. A 34% discount is available on all fares for journeys between any two stations on the route. Up to two children can accompany the cardholder for a flat fare of £2.00 each. The Railcard may be purchased at Llandrindod station, or by postal application. The scheme was relaunched and extended on 29 September 2005.

=== Highland Railcard ===
This costs £15.00 per year, and is available to applicants aged 16 or over who live in certain areas of the north and west Highlands of Scotland - principally the IV and KW postal districts. A 50% discount is available for the cardholder for all journeys on the following routes:

- The Kyle of Lochalsh Line between Inverness and Kyle of Lochalsh
- The Far North Line between Inverness and its two termini (Thurso and Wick)
- The West Highland Line between Glasgow Queen Street and its two termini (Oban and Mallaig)

Railcards are issued after an application form is completed and submitted by post or to the ticket office at Dingwall, Fort William, Inverness, Kyle of Lochalsh, Mallaig, Oban, Thurso or Wick stations.

The current form of the Railcard dates from 3 January 1999, when a previous version covering a more restricted geographical area was merged with the former West Highland Railcard, which was itself introduced in 1993.

The "original" Highland Railcard scheme appears to date from 1988, as ticket stock (British Rail form number BR 4599/79) was being printed in that year, but only the details of its subsequent relaunches are known. The first change happened as from 1 October 1991, with a six-month Railcard being priced at £4.00 and giving a 34% discount on all ticket types for journeys between Inverness and Kyle of Lochalsh, Thurso and Wick. In September 1994, the Railcard was made available free, and a 34% discount was available on the standard Child fare for one accompanying child. From 3 January 1999, when the West Highland Railcard was integrated into it, the price became £5.00 and two accompanying children could travel for £2.00 each. The price subsequently rose to its current £15.00 level. The Child benefit was superseded by the "Kid for a Quid" tickets.

The West Highland Railcard lasted just over five years, from 1 October 1993 until 3 January 1999, but the boundaries of its validity were extended, it changed from priced to free of charge, and the areas prospective holders had to live in to qualify were altered. For the first year, the Railcard cost £5.00 for 12 months, and could be used for all journeys between Mallaig and Helensburgh Upper, and for through tickets on to Glasgow Queen Street. All fares were discounted by 34% with the Railcard, and one accompanying child could travel for 34% off the Child fare. As with the Highland Railcard, a relaunch in September 1994 made the card free of charge; the route to Oban was included at the same time. The British Rail form number for the ticket stock was BR 4599/145.

=== Pembrokeshire Railcard ===
This costs £5.00 for one year, and is available to residents (aged 16 or over) of certain postal districts in Pembrokeshire. Discounts of 34% are available on all journeys on the routes collectively known as the West Wales Line: the Fishguard Harbour, Milford Haven and Pembroke Dock branch lines, and the common section from Whitland via Carmarthen through to Swansea. Standard Day Returns now receive the discount, although tickets bought with the Railcard cannot be used on the section of the Heart of Wales line between Swansea and Llanelli. The Railcards can be bought at Haverfordwest and Carmarthen stations.

=== Valleys Line Railcards ===
On the Valley Lines network in South Wales, discounts are available with two Railcards:

- Valleys Senior Railcard – introduced on 30 May 1999, at a cost of £5.00 for one year, and gives a 50% discount on Cheap Day Return fares for journeys wholly within the Valley Lines area. There are no discounts for accompanying passengers. Tickets are issued with status code VAL-S. From February 2000, the price was reduced to £4.00 for permanent residents of the county boroughs of Rhondda Cynon Taff and Merthyr Tydfil. The form number of the ticket stock used is RSP 4599/206.
- Valleys Student Railcard – introduced at the same time as the Valleys Senior Railcard, this costs £9.00 for one year, and gives a 26% discount on Standard Day and Cheap Day Single and Return fares in the area, and a 10% discount on Seven Day Season Tickets. Originally, only Cheap Day Returns and season ticket received a discount. The demise of the Cornish Railcard means that this is the only Railcard anywhere in Great Britain that offers a discount on Season Tickets (although New Deal Photocards also do). Ticket stock bears the form number RSP 4599/216.

The Maesteg Line was initially excluded from the routes on which the railcards were valid; this anomaly was removed on 5 January 2003.

== Other discount cards ==
=== Gold Card and Gold Card Partner's Card ===
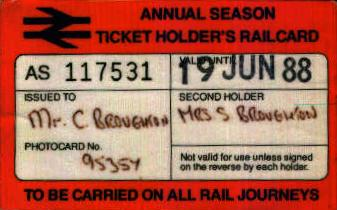
Pre-APTIS version of the Annual Season Ticket Holder's Railcard, issued for one year from June 1987.

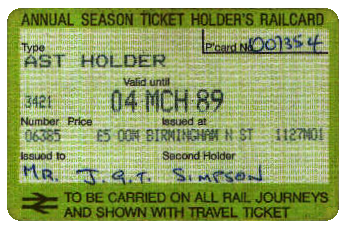
APTIS Annual Season Ticket Holder's Railcard, issued for one year from March 1988.

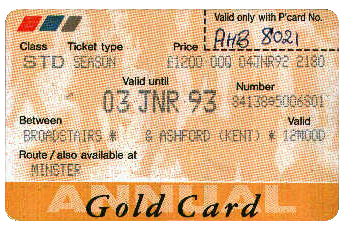
A Gold Card valid for unlimited travel for a year between Broadstairs and Ashford (Kent), and also discounted off-peak travel throughout the Network SouthEast area. Notice the Network SouthEast logo in the top left corner.

A Gold Card Partner's Card.

Between 12 May 1985 and 8 October 1988, holders of Annual Season Tickets could buy an Annual Season Ticket Holder's Railcard which gave a 50% discount on Cheap Day Return fares and 34% off Saver tickets for journeys throughout the British Rail network. Discounted tickets were issued with the status code AST-H. Up to four children could travel with the Railcard holder for £1.00 each; their tickets were printed with status code CHAST. Discounted Cheap Day Returns could not be bought on Fridays.

From September 1987, more than 12 months before the Annual Season Ticket Holder's Railcard was discontinued, a similar scheme began in the Network SouthEast area of London and southeast England. Annual season tickets issued for journeys within this area became known as Gold Cards, and the season ticket functioned as a Railcard giving various benefits which were broadly the same as those received by holders of the former Network Card: 34% discounts for themselves and up to three accompanying adults on most off-peak fares, £1.00 flat-fare tickets for children, and First Class Supplement upgrades. The same time restriction (after 10.00am on weekdays; all day at weekends and on public holidays) also applied. When a Gold Card holder is travelling on the route covered by their Gold Card with accompanying adults or children, a separate discounted ticket does not have to be purchased by the Gold Card holder in order to secure the relevant discounts for the other members of the group.

As of 2007, these discounts are still available. When the Network Card changed to the more restrictive "Network Railcard" format, with children receiving a 60% discount subject to a minimum £1.00 fare (rather than a £1.00 flat fare in all cases) and adults being subject to a £10.00 minimum fare on weekdays, the Gold Card's conditions remained the same as before, and have not changed since. First Class Supplement tickets for Gold Card holders costing £5.00 for adults and £3.00 for accompanying children were abolished from 2016, in lieu of which the Gold Card discount became available on first class tickets. At that time, the discounts became available from 09:30 instead of 10:00 on weekdays, the area of operation extended well into the West Midlands, and Virgin Trains and Virgin Trains East Coast (now LNER) withdrew from accepting Gold Card discounts. CrossCountry continues to accept them based on the old area, with a northern limit of Banbury.

A card giving the same benefits, usually known as the Partner's Card but officially named Gold Card Partner's Network Card, is also available. Initially, Gold Card holders could have a free Network Card issued to them on behalf of a friend, relative or partner; but from 8 January 1989, the new Partner's Card (on dedicated APTIS ticket stock, form number BR 4599/69) was issued instead, at a cost of £1.00. A relative or friend of the Gold Card holder could be nominated, and the Partner's Card could be used independently of the Gold Card—the two cardholders did not have to travel together. The First Class Supplement benefit was withdrawn from Partner's Cards at the same time as from Network Railcards. The card issued to the partner was later made once again a Network Railcard costing £1 and subject to the substantial minimum fare rule. This arrangement was eventually abolished in 2016; Gold Card holders may now purchase a 16–25 Railcard, Two Together Railcard, Disabled Person's Railcard, Senior Railcard, Network Railcard, or Family & Friends Railcard for themselves or anyone else for £10 by presenting the relevant application form and the Gold Card or Gold Record Card at a station in the Gold Card area.

Following the introduction of the Gold Card and the Partner's Card, a new status code was introduced for tickets issued with these: GOLDC for adult tickets, with child tickets showing CHNGC. GOLD was occasionally seen on adult tickets in 1990.

A traveller purchasing an annual Travelcard loaded on an Oyster card is issued a "Gold Record Card" when the ticket is sold (or by post for tickets issued online or by telesales). The Gold Record Card can be used to access Gold Card discounts in the same way as a Gold Card annual season ticket issued by train operating companies.

=== JobcentrePlus Travel Discount Card ===
The Department for Work and Pensions, through its executive agency Jobcentre Plus (formerly the Employment Service), administered a scheme whereby unemployed people can gain discounts of 50% on a wide range of travel and Season tickets. This was intended to assist them in their search for employment, although they can be used for discounts on leisure journeys as well. The Employment Service authorised and issued the cards, originally called New Deal Photocards, which were valid for three months at a time. Discounts were available on all Standard class travel tickets within England and Wales, Peak and Off Peak One Day Travelcards, Seven Day Season Tickets and Travelcards, and Longer Period (one month and more) Season Tickets and Travelcards, subject to the validity of the Photocard. There were no discounts for First Class tickets. The scheme was introduced in 1998, with Photocards being issued from 24 May 1998. The scheme was initially run on a trial basis, but is now finished since the introduction of the UK Government's Work Programme. It was governed by an agreement between ATOC and Jobcentre Plus, which was last renewed in 2002. By July 2000, 54,000 New Deal Photocards had been issued.

There is a separate scheme in Scotland. Photocards are issued for periods of up to six months, but discounts are only available on seven-day season tickets for journeys wholly within Scotland. JobCentres themselves also sell certain Standard Day Return tickets for Scottish journeys, again at a 50% discount. These arrangements began on 6 April 1998.

Document explaining the New Deal Scheme, including full details of discounted tickets

== Campaign for a National Railcard ==
Railfuture, an independent pressure group for rail users, has been campaigning for a number of years for a National Railcard to replace the plethora of different railcards. Such a card would take a similar form to Deutsche Bahn's BahnCard in Germany. A study undertaken jointly by Railfuture and the Rail Passengers Council (now known as Transport Focus) in April 2003 suggested that three million people would buy such a Railcard for £20.00 if it gave a one third discount on off-peak fares. The "most conservative forecast" indicated that 2.7 million people would buy a card at this price and with this discount, increasing passenger mileage per annum by 11% and rail industry profits by £50M. The profit-maximising combination was found to be a price of £30.00 and a 50% discount on off-peak fares; passenger mileage would rise by an estimated 25% and profits would increase by £70M.

== Children ==
At all times, up to two children under the age of five may travel free of charge with an accompanying adult, and do not require a ticket (but see the Family Railcard article for one exception to this). Children between the ages of 5 and 15 (inclusive) travel at half of the standard adult fare. (Full adult fare for journeys are almost always in multiples of £0.10; in the rare instances where the adult fare is a multiple of £0.05, the child fare will be rounded up to the nearest £0.05.)

Children can gain further reductions by travelling with adults who are using certain Railcards, or adults travelling on certain other concessionary tickets.

== GroupSave ==
Since 1999, many train operating companies have elected to join this Rail Delivery Group-administered scheme. Originally for three or four adults travelling for the price of two with up to four accompanying children at £1.00 each, the concessionary product was modified in 2014 to allow between three and nine adults and children to travel at 34% discount off the adult fare. The group must travel together at all times. No further discounts (using Railcards, for example) are available for any of the passengers.

Tickets are issued for adults with the status code GPS-3. Children can travel on adult tickets where this is necessary to bring a group up to the minimum requirement for the concession. There are no Groupsave discounts available on child fares. An alternative for TOCs is to use their own child flat fares where available in combination with adult GroupSave to offer discounts to mixed groups.

At first, the scheme applied only in the London and South East (former Network SouthEast) area; but from January 2006, it was extended to cover Train Operating Companies (TOCs) outside this area. In addition, some TOCs allow children to be "upgraded" to adults to benefit from GroupSave when two adults travel with a child.

The National Rail "GroupSave" sub-site describes the scheme in the London and South East (former Network SouthEast) area, where it duplicates the Network Railcard's function to some extent.

== Accompanied animals and articles ==
All quotations and statistics in this section are taken from the May 1991 edition (No. 6) of the Ticket Examiners' Handbook, produced by the British Railways Board.

The British Railways Board made detailed provisions for the carriage of large and/or heavy items, pets and similar, and specific fare ranges and ticket status codes were set up within the APTIS and PORTIS/SPORTIS ticket issuing systems for these. In the later British Rail era, articles could be carried free of charge subject to the following conditions:

- Weight: not to exceed 154 lb (First Class) or 110 lb (Standard Class)
- Able to be "taken into the coach without inconvenience to other customers, or ... readily loaded and accommodated in the guard's van"

A charge of 50% of the standard adult fare, subject to a maximum fare of £4.00 or £8.00 (depending on the type of ticket held by the passenger), would be charged for the following:

- "Dogs, cats and other small inoffensive animals or birds" (maximum of two per passenger)
- Non-folding prams (maximum of two per passenger)
- Skis and surfboards (maximum of one per passenger)
- Cellos (maximum of one per passenger)
- Disabled persons' "runabout" or other electric vehicles (maximum of one per passenger; not permitted in InterCity 125, InterCity 225 or sliding-door trains)

In all of these cases, a ticket with the status code AAA would be issued for the article. This was represented as A A A on APTIS and PORTIS tickets until 1988. (Such tickets also showed NIL adults and NIL children, uniquely.)

Items exceeding the weight or size parameters, including furniture, canoes, hang-gliders and large musical instruments, had to be issued with a ticket at the standard adult rate.

Most railcards and certain other concessionary fares could be combined with the Accompanied Animals and Articles discount, resulting in much larger discounts on the standard adult fare. The status code RCAAA was used when a railcard was held.

Since privatisation, the situation has become less clear-cut, with many Train Operating Companies allowing greater freedom for such items to be carried free of charge. Appendix B of the National Rail Conditions of Carriage sets out the current allowances and fare details. The special status codes are no longer used.

== Privilege tickets ==
Some railway employees, their spouses or partners and their dependent children are able to travel on the railway network free of charge or at a substantial discount on the standard adult or child fare, depending on the type of staff travel pass, privilege pass or staff identity card they possess. In cases where free travel is not available—either on certain routes or on all routes—the standard discount for adults is 75% of the full adult fare (i.e. a quarter-rate fare), although certain cheap-rate tickets (such as Off Peak Day Returns) are not available in conjunction with the discount. Such tickets are endorsed with status code PRIV. Children travel at an 88% discount on the standard adult fare, usually subject to a maximum fare of £2.00. The status code for child privilege tickets is CHPRV. An "Accompanied Animals and Articles" ticket can be issued in conjunction with a privilege ticket, although as noted above such tickets are very rarely issued now; such a ticket would be endorsed with status code PRAAA, and would be at a discount of 88% to the standard adult fare, subject to a maximum fare of £1.00.

=== Foreign railway employees ===
Employees, and in some cases their spouses and/or dependent children, of most railway companies in Europe west of the border of the former Soviet Union (excepting Sweden, which withdrew from the arrangements in 2001, and Albania which was never a member) can obtain tickets at a 50% discount on the full adult fare (75% discount in the case of employees of the Belgian, French, Irish, and Northern Irish railways). Employees, and in some cases depending on reciprocal arrangements their spouses and/or dependent children, can obtain one or (in the case of Belgian, Dutch, French, Irish, and Northern Irish railways) two coupon tickets per year each giving up to two days free travel on four occasions in a three-month validity period. A much smaller number of railways allow one coupon ticket per year on a reciprocal basis to each other's retired former staff, and sometimes to their spouses.

There are also various reciprocal travel arrangements for railway staff from many countries outside Europe.

== c2c Guide Dogs scheme ==
In 2005, c2c launched a scheme to allow people training guide dogs for the blind to travel on their services free of charge.

== Virgin Trains scheme for employees of registered charities ==
Virgin Trains offered qualifying charities a 20% discount off the full range of Virgin Trains-only Advance Purchase fares, including first class.

Tickets could be bought up to 23:59 the day before travel and collected from a FastTicket machine at the station. The scheme requires the traveller to be in possession of a valid charity photo ID card or dated letter of authority on charity headed paper with discounted charity tickets.

The discount was available to registered charities that are able to prove a minimum 10% voluntary funding level. This can be validated by a letter from the finance director, or similar, stating your 10% minimum voluntary funding; or for charities with an income over £500,000, a link to the page on the Charity Commission website (OSCR in Scotland) that shows your charity's funding status.

Avanti West Coast did not maintain this discount when they took over the franchise from Virgin in 2019.

== Extra concessions ==
As part of the National Concessionary Pass scheme for buses, authorities have the option of adding extra concessions to their area for the benefit of local residents. Transport for West Midlands, as part of their options, allow residents in the West Midlands (County), as defined by Dudley, Wolverhampton, Walsall, Sandwell, Birmingham, Solihull and Coventry Council areas, to use local rail services (within the West Midlands) using their National Concessionary Passes for free after 09.30 on weekdays and all day weekends/Bank Holidays. No separate ticket is needed.

Leicester City Council offer something similar, passes are also valid for free train travel at all times on train journeys between Leicester and stations in Leicestershire, and between Leicester and Derby, Nottingham, Grantham, Peterborough, Kettering and Nuneaton.

Transport for Greater Manchester employ a similar scheme, encompassing the county of Greater Manchester, however this, in addition to local rail services, allows free travel on the Manchester Metrolink trams for holders of local Manchester passes. It is now required to pay a fee of £10 to add train & tram travel on to a concessionary pass for persons over the state retirement age. Disabled persons do not pay this fee.

When a pass holding resident of one of these areas is buying a ticket for a train journey originating in the area of their respective transport authority, but is travelling to a destination outside the boundary for that authority, the passenger would only be charged for a ticket from the last station on the route that is inside the area managed by the authority. This means that, for example, if a National Concessionary Pass holder living in Manchester bought a ticket from Manchester Piccadilly to London Euston, then they would only be charged for a journey from Stockport to Euston, as this would be the last railway station on the line within Greater Manchester where the train stopped.

Merseytravel National Concessionary Passes are also valid on all National Rail services within Merseyside, as well as all services outside Merseyside operated by Merseyrail, as far as Chester, Ellesmere Port and Ormskirk. They are also valid for single Mersey ferry crossings. There is a special local concessionary pass called "Merseytravel Over 60s pass " for persons older than 60 but under state retirement age which is valid within Merseyside only plus the whole Merseyrail network. Neither type of pass is valid for travel between 06.30 and 09.30.
