= Network Railcard =

British Rail discount card

- Product type: Public transport
- Country: United Kingdom
- Introduced: 1986
- Related brands: National Rail Enquiries; British Rail
- Markets: United Kingdom
- Website: www.network-railcard.co.uk

The earliest version of the Network Card, issued manually rather than through an APTIS machine.

The first APTIS version of the Network Card. This was used from the start of the APTIS era in 1986/1987 until well into the 1990s, as stocks had to be used up despite the introduction of the new-look orange-banded version in 1991.

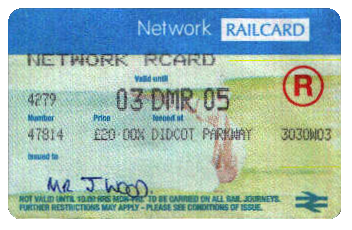
The introduction of the weekday minimum fare condition in 2002 resulted in a minor change: the red "R" shows that this is the "Revised" version of the railcard.

The Network Railcard is a discount card introduced in 1986 by British Rail, upon the creation of their Network SouthEast sector in parts of Southern England.

The card is intended to encourage leisure travel by rail by offering discounts for adults and accompanying children on a wide range of off-peak fares. The range of discounts available, and the price of the card, have varied since that time, but the card has always been valid for a year's unlimited frequency of use.

It can be purchased by any person aged 16 or over from any staffed National Rail station or Rail Appointed Travel Agent, by completing an application form – no photographic identification or other documentation is needed to buy or use the card. It is one of a number of concessionary fare schemes available on the British railway system.

== History ==
The Network SouthEast brand was introduced to what had been the London & South East sector of British Rail on 10 June 1986. The railcard was then introduced on 29 September 1986, under the name Network Card. It offered a 34% discount on all off-peak fares for journeys wholly within the Network SouthEast area. Tickets valid at peak times, such as Day Returns and Open Returns, were excluded, as were First Class tickets (however, a supplement ticket could be bought to upgrade a discounted Standard Class ticket to First Class at weekends). On weekdays, journeys had to start after 10.00am, but there were no time restrictions at weekends or on Bank Holidays. Up to three adults could accompany the railcard holder and gain the same discount, while up to four accompanying children could travel for a £1.00 flat fare. This version of the railcard could be issued for either one person or two people. On a two-person "joint-holder" ticket, either or both of the named holders could travel – that is, the card was transferable between the two.

The first major change was made as from 28 September 1997. At this time, the name Network Railcard was adopted; the joint-holder option was removed; the price was increased to £20.00; and the First Class supplement facility was discontinued. All other benefits remained the same, however. New ticket stock was introduced with APTIS form number RSP 4599/188 (the Network Card was BR 4599/22 and, after privatisation, RSP 4599/22).

A larger and more controversial change occurred as from 2 June 2002, when the discount level was changed: a minimum adult fare of £10.00 was imposed for weekday journeys, and children now received an 81% discount on the full adult fare (equivalent to a 60% on the full child fare, and subject to a minimum fare of £1.00) instead of the former £1.00 flat fare for all journeys. This meant that on a weekday, holders would receive no discount if the standard adult full fare was £10.00 or less, and a discount of less than 34% on fares between £10.05 and £15.00. Longer journeys for children would also become more expensive. Transport pressure group Transport 2000 and environmental organisation Friends of the Earth condemned the proposals, and Reading East MP Jane Griffiths tabled an Early Day Motion in the British Parliament opposing the changes. This gained the support of 38 other MPs from all major parties. Research commissioned by Transport 2000 indicated that 90% of journeys typically made in the railcard area would no longer gain any discount (as a result of the full adult fare being £10.00 or below), a further 3.5% would attract a discount of less than 34%, and only 6.5% would still be subject to the full 34% discount as before. This reflects the fact that many journeys undertaken in the area are short and "local" in nature, and that the area as a whole is relatively small in size.

To compensate for the problems and disruption experienced on the railway network between 2000 and 2002, Network Railcards bought in the early months of 2002 (until 18 May 2002) were issued for 15 months for the price of 12.

The Heathrow Express service between London Paddington and Heathrow Airport, which was introduced in 1998, was excluded until March 2006. Since then, however, a 34% discount has been available on adult tickets in Express Class (the equivalent of Standard Class), subject to the usual Railcard weekday time restrictions.

In May 2009 the Network Railcard terms were revised again, making the card both more expensive and raising the minimum fare for a discount to £13.00.

Until July 2014, the Network Railcard was not valid on the regular Gatwick Express service, and was only valid on those running to Brighton. It is now valid on all Gatwick Express services, subject to the usual weekday time restrictions.

== Tickets issued with Network Cards/Railcards ==
On the APTIS, PORTIS/SPORTIS and other computerised ticket issuing systems, a "status code" field is provided on each ticket issued. This is left blank if an adult is travelling at full (undiscounted) fare; but if any discount or other special condition applies, a code of up to five letters appears.

Adult tickets issued with the original Network Card displayed a status code of NSE, while child tickets showed CHNSE. These codes continued in use when the Network Railcard was introduced in its place, until the major change in June 2002. When the "new" Network Railcard was introduced, with the £10.00 minimum fare and altered child discount, there were still a large number of "old" Network Railcards in use, with no minimum fare restriction and £1.00 flat fares for children. A method of distinguishing these on tickets had to be developed. ATOC introduced the following codes accordingly, and uploaded them to all ticket issuing systems in mid-2002:

- "Old" Network Railcard adult fare: NR01A
- "Old" Network Railcard child fare: NR01C
- "New" Network Railcard adult fare: NR02A
- "New" Network Railcard child fare: NR02C

By August 2003 (18 May 2002 + 15 months), no "old" Network Railcards remained in use, and ATOC eventually stopped using the new codes on ticket issuing systems, reverting to NSE and CHNSE instead; however, the codes NR02A and NR02C are still used in paper and online forms of the National Fares Manuals issued to the train operating companies, Rail Appointed Travel Agents and other ticket-issuing locations.

| Adult status codes | Child status codes |

== Price ==
The price of the railcard increased over the years, and different prices were sometimes charged for "joint holder" status and according to whether Senior Railcards or Young Persons Railcards were held as well.

| Effective from | Single-holder railcard | When bought by Young Persons Railcard holder | When bought by Senior Railcard holder | Joint-holder railcard | When bought by Young Persons Railcard holder | When bought by Senior Railcard holder |
|---|---|---|---|---|---|---|
| 29 September 1986 | £10.00 | N/A | £5.00 | £10.00 | N/A | £5.00 |
| 1 March 1987 | £10.00 | £5.00 | £5.00 | £10.00 | £5.00 | £5.00 |
| 12 May 1991 | £12.00 | £8.00 | £8.00 | £15.00 | £10.00 | £10.00 |
| 29 May 1994 | £14.00 | £10.00 | £10.00 | £17.00 | £12.00 | £12.00 |
| 28 September 1997 | £20.00 | N/A | N/A | N/A | N/A | N/A |
| 17 May 2009 | £25.00 | N/A | N/A | N/A | N/A | N/A |
| 22 May 2011 | £28.00 | N/A | N/A | N/A | N/A | N/A |
| 19 May 2013 | £30.00 | N/A | N/A | N/A | N/A | N/A |

A First Class supplement ticket showing the post-February 1990 flat fare of £3.00.

As can be seen, discounts of various sizes were given until 1997 to holders of Young Persons and Senior Railcards who wanted to buy a Network Card. Upon the relaunch under the "Network Railcard" name, this facility was withdrawn. These discounted Network Cards were issued in bulk on British Rail's behalf at an agency in Slough, and carried an endorsement on the reverse to show which type of reduction applied.

First Class supplement upgrade tickets were initially priced at a flat fare of £1.00 for both adults and children for any length of journey. This became £3.00 for adults and £1.50 for children in February 1990. The benefit was withdrawn upon the introduction of the first Network Railcard on 28 September 1997.

=== Gold card discount (season tickets) ===
Holders of annual season tickets for journeys within the Network Rail area, including on London Underground, are issued with a "Gold Card" which gives them similar privileges to the Network Railcard, as well as being able to purchase a Network Railcard for a friend or family member for a discounted price of £10.00 There is no minimum fare for "Gold Card" discounts, and the ability to upgrade to First Class for a flat fare also remains. This includes cases where the annual season ticket is applied to an Oyster card.

== Popularity ==
When the Network Card was introduced, it quickly became popular with the public: more than 500,000 were sold per year at first, and a noticeable increase in use of the rail network at off-peak times for leisure purposes was achieved. Although ownership had declined to around 360,000 by the time of the £10.00 minimum fare change in 2002, extra ticket sales totalling approximately £70 million were still generated per year. (For comparison, total ticket sales across the whole British railway network, including peak, off-peak and other tickets, are approximately £3.5 billion.) Ownership of railcards has stayed fairly stable since then; and with 360,000 sold at £20 each (£28 in 2011), sales of the railcards themselves bring in more than £7 million per year, before the additional revenue from journeys made with them is taken into account.

== Network Railcard area ==
The Railcard scheme is administered by the Rail Delivery Group on behalf of the following train operating companies (TOCs), some or all of whose services are within the boundaries of the railcard area:

| Valid on all services | c2c; Elizabeth line; Heathrow Express; Island Line; London Overground; Southeastern; Southern; Stansted Express |
| Valid on services within boundaries of railcard area | Abellio Greater Anglia; Avanti West Coast; Chiltern Railways; CrossCountry; East Midlands Railway; Govia Thameslink Railway; Great Western Railway; London North Eastern Railway; South Western Railway; West Midlands Trains |

=== Original area ===
When Network SouthEast was created in 1986, its boundaries represented the boundaries of the railcard area. Since then, some small extensions have been made. The original boundaries were:

- The West of England Main Line, as far south as Whimple – see the exception below
- Bedwyn on the Great Western Main Line
- The route from Reading to Banbury, incorporating the Cherwell Valley Line
- Northampton on the West Coast Main Line
- Bedford on the Midland Main Line
- Huntingdon on the East Coast Main Line
- King's Lynn on the Fen Line
- Manningtree on the Great Eastern Main Line
- The Harwich branch line (Mayflower Line) from Manningtree to Harwich Town

All other main lines and branches south and east of these were included, except the Gatwick Express service between London Victoria and Gatwick Airport.

The exception on the West of England Main Line related to tickets issued from or to Pinhoe, Exeter Central and Exeter St Davids stations. Discounted tickets could be bought to or from these stations provided they were not for journeys to, from or via London or Reading. This is because the faster route (via Westbury) was (and still is) available from Exeter to London and Reading; it was wholly outside the Network SouthEast area, and higher fares applied to it than to the route via the West of England Main Line.

=== Current area ===
The following extensions have been made at various times since the scheme was introduced:

- The Whimple-Exeter St Davids section is now wholly incorporated within the railcard area, meaning that tickets to, from or via London or Reading can be bought at a discount – although as before, this only applies to tickets routed via the West of England Main Line. This change happened by 1990.
- The Weymouth to Yeovil Pen Mill section of the Heart of Wessex Line. This also happened by 1990.
- The Cotswold Line between Oxford and Worcester Foregate Street, as from 28 May 1995.
- Long Buckby, the next station north of Northampton, was included when Silverlink introduced regular direct services from there to London Euston; these ceased for several years, with the station remaining within the boundary, and regular direct services have since resumed.

The London & South East map shows the boundary of the Network Railcard area as of 2019.
