= Senior Railcard =

British Rail discount card

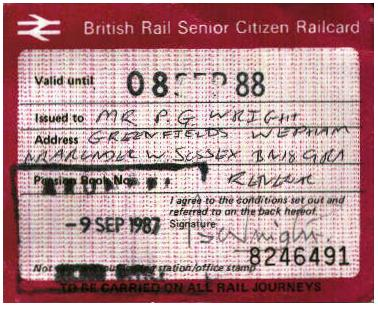
Pre-APTIS Railcard issued in 1988.

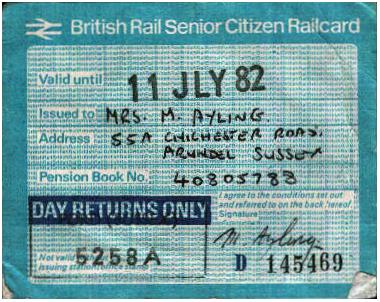
Pre-APTIS "Day Returns Only" version of the Railcard from 1981.

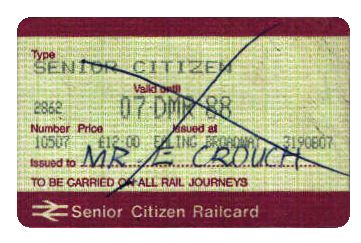
The earliest APTIS version of the Senior Citizen Railcard.

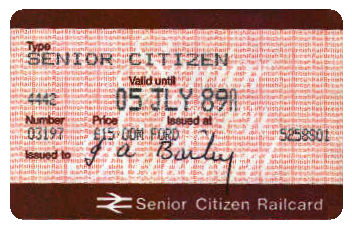
The first revision, from January 1988.

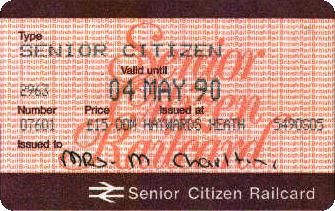
A change in October 1988: the background lettering becomes brown.

The Senior Railcard is an annual card available to people aged 60 and over, which gives discounts on certain types of railway ticket in Britain. The Railcard has existed in various forms since 1975; the current version is priced at £35.00 and is valid for one year, with a 3-year card available for £80. It is one of a wide variety of discounted and concessionary fare schemes available on Britain's railway network.

== History ==
During the early 1970s, some of British Rail's Regions offered a series of small, localised travel promotions for people of or near retirement age. The London Midland and Southern regions were particularly active in this, although other examples existed elsewhere. These promotions were characterised by restricted validity and geographical availability. For example, one Southern Region scheme introduced in 1970 offered pensioners half-price travel at off-peak times on Tuesdays, Wednesdays and Thursdays only, for journeys from a set list of around twenty stations, upon production of their pension book (to confirm their eligibility).

All of these schemes were superseded by the introduction of the first Senior Citizen Railcard (as it was then known), valid throughout Britain, on 1 April 1975. This took the form of a large, thin card (British Rail form number BR 24889^{A} ) with a pre-printed expiry date of 31 March 1976 (so Railcards issued later in 1975 were valid for less than a full year), on which the holder's name, address, pension book number and signature had to be added. Holders had to meet one of the following criteria:

- Retirement pension book held; or
- Resident in United Kingdom with a pension received from another country; or
- No pension received, but aged over 65 and resident in United Kingdom.

The discounts available were relatively limited in relation to those available with the current Railcard:

- Half price travel on Tuesdays, Wednesdays and Thursdays only, in Second Class accommodation only; all Ordinary Single/Return and Day Single/Return fares were included
- 25% discounts on some Sealink ferry services, operated at the time by British Rail

At first, the Railcard cost £4.32 (£4.00 + 8% value added tax charge), although this was soon reduced to £4.00 when the VAT charge was removed.

A major change occurred as from 1 April 1976. A separate "Day Returns Only" Railcard, priced at £3.00, was introduced alongside the original Railcard, whose price was raised to £6.00. The cheaper Railcard gave discounts only on Day Return tickets—not on any Singles or Ordinary (Period) Returns. From the same date, two major enhancements were made, both of which applied to both types of Railcard: discounted travel could take place on any day of the week, and First Class travel gained the same discounts as Second Class. Also, a 50% discount was now given on Sealink ferry services to all destinations.

In the next few years, until the next major revision in 1985, the main changes to the Railcards' conditions related to the qualification criteria. From January 1978, these were extended slightly, with people aged 60 or over who received Widow's Pensions or War Widow's Pensions being included. From January 1980, anybody resident in Britain and aged at least 60 (for women) or 65 (for men), and British people living abroad but meeting these age criteria, could buy the Railcard. Finally, from 30 March 1984, a further simplification took place: anybody aged 60 or over could hold one. This condition still applies as of 2007. Other additions included the introduction of certain discounts on Motorail services, London Underground journeys (these were charged at child rate for Railcard holders), through travel to the Isle of Man and various European destinations, and discounts on all-inclusive holidays by rail.

12 May 1985 saw changes to the range of fares which received discounts, and in some cases to the level of the discounts, in respect of the "full" version of the Railcard (which by now cost £12.00). The "Day Returns Only" Railcard still gave 50% discounts on those fares, but the full version now gave only a 34% saving on Standard Single and Return fares and the new off-peak Saver tickets. ("Standard" was the new name for the former "Ordinary" category of ticket, being the highest priced and least restricted. These are now known as "Open" tickets.) A 50% discount was now only available on Day Returns and the new off-peak equivalent, the Cheap Day Return. Further restrictions on journeys by ferry and ship were made in 1985 and 1986, while Rover and Ranger tickets of all types ("go-anywhere" multi-journey tickets covering particular geographic areas) were included within the discount scheme from May 1987, with a saving of 34% available for Railcard holders.

By this time, the "Day Returns Only" card could only be used to buy Cheap Day Returns, following the introduction of the "Cheap Day" fare to distinguish between peak-time and off-peak journeys. "Cheap Day Returns Only" wording began to appear on these Railcards accordingly; but they were withdrawn from 10 January 1988, with the price of the "full" Railcard being increased from £12.00 to £15.00 at the same time. The APTIS ticket issuing system had been introduced in late 1986, and was still in the process of being rolled out across the British Rail network in 1988, so the APTIS "Cheap Day Returns Only" Railcard (form number BR 4599/18) is rarely seen. The first APTIS version of the full Railcard (BR 4599/17), with mauve upper and lower bands,^{B} also lasted until 10 January 1988, at which point the following changes were made: security background (miniature repeats of the words "British Rail") was changed from the light green colour seen on most APTIS ticket stock to a dark pink; the upper and lower bands became dark brown; and part of the background was filled with the words "Senior Citizen Railcard" in cursive writing in white. This style lasted only until October 1988, at which point the white lettering changed to brown.

The Railcard was renamed Senior Railcard in May 1990.

From 5 January 1992, several changes were made to the discounts available. Reduced fares for journeys wholly on the London Underground network were withdrawn; children accompanying the Railcard holder no longer travelled for a £1.00 flat fare (see here); Day Singles and Day Returns for weekday journeys within the Network SouthEast area no longer received a discount, restricting Railcard holders to off-peak travel; and One Day Travelcard discounts became more restricted. From 1985, when the "One Day Capitalcard" (as it was then known) was introduced, Railcard holders gained a 50% discount. This applied from any Network SouthEast station either within or outside the Travelcard zonal area, and for Capitalcards valid for any combination of zones. The discount on "All Zones" Travelcards was reduced to 34% on 6 January 1991, although other zonal combinations still attracted a 50% discount. As from 5 January 1992, however, only the All Zones One Day Travelcard received any discount. (The level was maintained at 34%.)

There have been few significant changes since then, with frequent changes in the design of the Railcard being the most noticeable. On all types of ticket for which a discount is available, the level is 34%, as it has been since the changes of 1992; and the types of tickets which receive discounts remains largely the same. The discount is also available on most new ticket types introduced since then, such as SuperAdvance and Virgin Value. Similarly, there has been little change in the types of ticket excluded from receiving discounts; these are summarised here. The restriction on journeys made in the morning peak in the former Network SouthEast area (now known as the "London and South East area") also remains.

== Applications ==
Railcards can be booked at railway stations, Rail Appointed Travel Agencies and other ticket-issuing locations; through the post (only for Railcard renewals, not for first-time purchases); by telephone, through Train Operating Company telesales facilities; and online at a dedicated website accessible from ATOC's central "Railcards" website. Some local authorities offer the cards at a discount of around 20% (see below - Related Schemes).

In the early years, applications could only be made in person at stations and travel agencies. Because applicants were required to hold a pension book or similar, this had to presented at the time the Railcard was purchased; the pension book number was then written on the front of the Railcard. Now, when a Railcard is bought in person, applicants must complete the form found inside the Senior Railcard leaflet available from ticket sales points and show proof of age. Online purchase requires registration using a valid e-mail address and password, and a UK passport or driving licence number for identification. Renewal of Railcards by post became possible in 1989; an agency based at Harrington Dock in Liverpool deals with all applications. During the period when the APTIS system was in use, this office had a single machine which validated Railcards with the location name MERSEYRAIL LPOOL and National Location Code 2202. (One such ticket is shown below.)

== Price ==
The price of the "full" Railcard has been increased on several occasions since 1975. The shorter-lived "Day Returns Only" (and, later, "Cheap Day Returns Only") version also experienced regular increases.

Effective from	"Full" railcard	"Cheap Day Returns only" railcard	Notes
1 April 1975	£4.32	N/A	Included VAT @ 8%
Later in 1975	£4.00	N/A	VAT charge dropped
1 April 1976	£6.00	£3.00	
8 January 1978	£7.00	£3.50	
May 1979	£8.00	£4.00	
28 January 1980	£10.00	£5.00	
19 June 1983	£12.00	£7.00	
10 January 1988	£15.00	N/A	"Cheap Day Returns only" card withdrawn
7 January 1990	£16.00	N/A	
17 August 1997	£18.00	N/A	
May 2004	£20.00	N/A	
2 January 2008	£24.00	N/A	
19 May 2013	£30.00	N/A	
2 March 2025	£35.00	N/A	

== Tickets issued with a Railcard ==
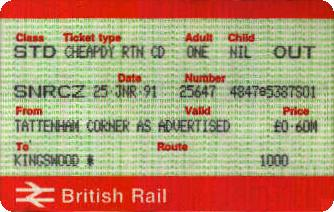
The SNRCZ variation, seen from the introduction of APTIS and PORTIS in 1986 until early 1992.

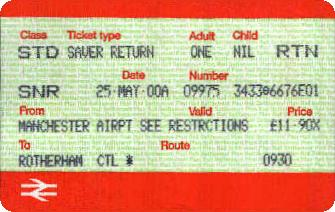
The SNR variation, introduced when the Railcard was renamed "Senior Railcard". This wording remains in use today.

On the APTIS, PORTIS/SPORTIS and other computerised ticket issuing systems, a "status code" field is provided on each ticket issued. This is left blank if an adult is travelling at full (undiscounted) fare; but if any discount or other special condition applies, a code of up to five letters appears.

When APTIS and PORTIS (the predecessor of SPORTIS) were introduced, from late 1986, the Railcard was named "Senior Citizen Railcard", and a status code of SNRCZ was used to identify a ticket bought with the Railcard. Following the renaming to "Senior Railcard" in January 1992, this was changed to SNR. The two codes were used alongside each other during the period in which both "Senior Citizen Railcards" and "Senior Railcards" were in circulation. The code SNR has been used exclusively ever since, including on the various "New Generation" systems that have replaced APTIS and SPORTIS.

== Accompanying children ==
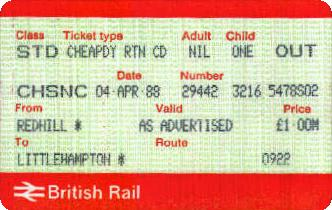
An APTIS ticket showing status code CHSNC.

From January 1980, special flat fares were introduced for children travelling with the Railcard holder. At first, up to four children (between 5 and 15 years of age inclusive) could travel per senior citizen, each paying £0.50 irrespective of the length of the journey. This was increased to £1.00 on 1 February 1981. From 12 March 1985, flat fares only applied in Second Class accommodation. Finally, on 5 January 1992, child discounts with the Railcard were withdrawn completely; any accompanying children now had to pay the normal child fare.

On the APTIS and PORTIS/SPORTIS ticket issuing systems, the status code CHSNC was used to denote a child travelling with a Senior Citizen Railcard holder.

== Related schemes ==
There have been, and continue to be, many variations on the standard Railcard; and as well as the regular discounts, various short-term or seasonal offers have been available to Railcard holders.

=== Local authorities ===
Many local government areas, such as Borough Councils and District Councils, either provide discounted Railcards to residents or offer their own area-specific version. The latter is unusual, although examples are known from the 1980s from the former Beverley Borough Council and Lancashire County Council, both valid on rail services only in those areas. It is more common for local authorities to offer residents the full Railcard at a reduced price (or even free of charge). Examples from around England include:

- Broadland District Council, Norfolk: £18.00; sent by post after completing online application form
- Congleton Borough Council, Cheshire: £15.00; available from any of five Council offices.
- Herefordshire County Council £17:00 from the Council's Info Shops.
- South Gloucestershire £16:00 from council offices and other places.
- West Lancashire District Council free; available from Council offices.
- [http

Such tickets are issued in bulk at a local station's ticket office or at a travel agency, and are endorsed with the council's details. The full price, rather than the price the resident pays, is usually shown.

=== Promotional discounted Railcards ===
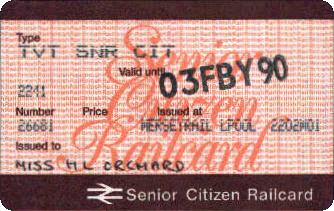
A Railcard issued at the Merseyrail office at Harrington Dock, Liverpool, in connection with a TV Times magazine promotion—hence the blank "Price" field.

British Rail and, later, ATOC have collaborated with various organisations and businesses to offer free or reduced-rate Railcards, sometimes for periods shorter than one year.

The television listings magazine TV Times is known to have offered reduced-rate Railcards to its readers for periods of approximately one month in 1989, 1990, 1991 and 1997. The 1990 and 1991 promotions were run in January and offered a £6.00 reduction in the purchase price, while in 1997 an £8.00 reduction (equivalent to 50%) applied between late August and late September. Tickets were issued in bulk at the Harrington Dock agency in Liverpool, as illustrated, and showed a blank "Price".

Free Railcards with short validity periods, designed to attract potential Railcard users who may not have considered buying one, have been given away with jars of Horlicks malted milk powder (spring 1998), on the cover of "Active Life" magazine—a general-interest publication aimed at over-50s (March/April 1998 edition), by the charity Help the Aged (June 1998), and with "Saga Magazine"—similar to "Active Life" magazine, produced by the British organisation Saga (1999–2000).

=== Free and reduced fares ===
A flat-rate promotional ticket from November 1987, showing ticket type SEN CIT PRM.

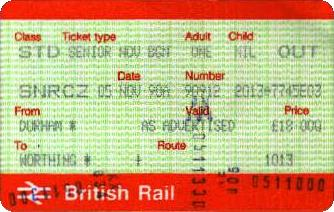
A ticket for the equivalent November promotion three years later, with ticket type SENIOR NOV BGN.

A SENIOR AWAYBREAK ticket from the first day of the three-week spring 1992 promotion.

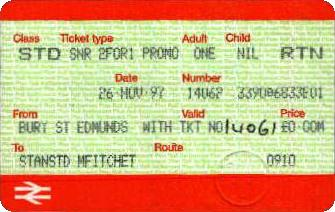
A SNR 2FOR1 PROMO ticket available during November and December 1997.

In addition to the standard discounts available over the years, many short-term promotional fares and ticket types have been made available to Railcard holders. Some of these have been in restricted geographical areas (or, since privatisation, on certain Train Operating Companies' services), while others have applied across the rail network. Examples include:

- Flat-fare "Go anywhere" tickets valid on Mondays to Thursdays inclusive, in November 1980, 1981 and 1982 and March 1981 and 1982.
- 50% discounts for accompanying adults throughout May 1983, in part of British Rail's Eastern Region.
- Off-peak "Go anywhere" flat-fare tickets in the "London & South East" area (the predecessor of Network SouthEast) in November 1983; four accompanying children travelled for £1.00, as could one dog. Fridays were excluded.
- Off-peak flat-fare (£2.00) point-to-point tickets within various large areas (Scotland, Wales, Cornwall and the "London & South East" zone) in November 1984; singles were available any day, and returns were sold on all days except Fridays. There were no child discounts, but one dog could accompany the senior citizen for £1.00.
- During each November from 1985 to 1990 inclusive, and in November 1995, Saver return tickets were available at a range of flat rates, offering substantial discounts (generally over 50%) on the full fare. These were marketed, and shown on tickets, under various names, such as Senior Citizen Promotion and Senior November Bargain. Children and dogs received flat-rate discounts until 1988.
- During spring 1988, First Class travel was available at the Standard Class price on Saver-rate fares.
- For three weeks from 27 April 1992, and again from 1 March 1994 to 27 March 1994, a 50% discount (instead of 34%) was offered for holders of the new, post-January 1992 Railcard on Saver, Supersaver and Awaybreak fares.
- In November 1994, off-peak returns on the Valley Lines network in Wales were priced at a flat rate of £1.00.
- During March 1995, for journeys between Brighton and Bournemouth (and intermediately), 50% discounts were available for the Railcard holder and an accompanying passenger.
- The discount was increased to 50% across all ticket types between 1 May 1995 and 14 May 1995 to celebrate the 50th anniversary of Victory in Europe Day (VE-Day).
- Heavily discounted sleeper train berths in summer 1995.
- £10.00 return tickets for the Railcard holder and an accompanying adult between any two stations in Britain between 25 January 1997 and 26 March 1997; obtainable by post or telephone only.
- Flat-fare (£8.00) tickets between any two destinations in Scotland in February 1997.
- Between 4 November and 14 December 1997, "two for one" off-peak tickets of various types for outward travel on Tuesdays and Wednesdays. This offer was backed by widespread magazine advertising.
- In June 1998, and again in March 1999, £7.50 returns between any two First Great Western stations, with tickets also being valid on any other train operator running in the same area. These were run in conjunction with campaigns by Help the Aged. A third such campaign was run in June 2000, with the price of the tickets having risen to £10.00.

=== Other offers ===
- In January and February 1995, in conjunction with British Rail, Post Office Ltd. sent leaflets to households across the Midlands with a voucher giving £1.00 off the purchase price of a Railcard.
- In September 1998, leaflets were distributed with various newspapers and magazines featuring vouchers for 50% off any rail ticket for anybody who bought a Railcard for the first time.
- In October 1998, the Women's Institute Home and Country Magazine included a voucher for a Senior Railcard valid for 15 months instead of the usual 12, for first-time buyers.
- Between December 1998 and January 1999, 110,000 prospective Railcard holders were sent vouchers for a free bottle of 50-year-old amontillado and £1.00 a bottle of ordinary sherry, if a Railcard was bought.
- British travel firm First Choice Holidays PLC offered £50.00 off a single-person package holiday in exchange for two different rail tickets issued with a Senior Railcard, or £100.00 off a multi-person holiday in exchange for four tickets, in a short-term promotion that began on 15 February 1999.
- The War Widows Association, an organisation working to improve living conditions for war widows and widowers in Britain, operated a marketing campaign in June 1999 which included vouchers for £6.00 off the price of a Railcard.
- For four weeks from 8 April 2000, a senior citizen buying a Railcard by telephone could order one free of charge for another person, subject to proof of entitlement being given.

== Popularity ==
Many millions of Senior Citizen and Senior Railcards have been sold since 1975. In 2015, when ATOC announced that railcards were to be digitally available as a download to mobile app, the number of Senior Railcards in circulation was stated to be 1,405,315.

== Notes ==
^{A} Form numbers are codes introduced by British Rail to classify and catalogue all printed material: documents, tickets, wage slips, notepaper, parcels labels and hundreds of other items. Form numbers consist of a primary code and, often, a sub-code, separated by /. APTIS tickets used primary code 4599 in British Rail days; this changed to 7599 on post-privatisation "RSP" tickets. Other primary codes have since been introduced on Rail Settlement Plan ticket stock for New Generation (post-APTIS) ticket issuing systems.
^{B} The official British Rail description of the colour is "mauve", but the actual colour of these tickets when printed more closely resembles the colour "Opera mauve" (Hex triplet #CA82AF).
