= Disabled Persons Railcard =

Railway discount scheme in the United Kingdom

The Disabled Persons Railcard is a concessionary fare scheme in the United Kingdom giving eligible passengers with disabilities benefits on the National Rail network including a 1/3 discount on fares.

== Card and discounts ==
The card is available as a one-year validity card for £20 and as a three-year validity card for £54. The Railcard holder can take another adult with them at the same discount rate.

All franchised train operating companies in Great Britain must accept the Railcard and offer discounts under terms set out in the Railways Act 1993. The Railcard is managed by Rail Delivery Group. It is aimed at people who have the most difficulty using rail for a reason relating to their disability. Its purpose is to encourage people to use the train and to reduce the cost for those who need to be accompanied by a carer.

In July 2022, there were over 228,000 Disabled Persons Railcards in circulation, increasing to 375,027 by October 2025.

== Origins ==
British Rail (BR) introduced the Disabled Persons Railcard in 1981 to mark the International Year of Disabled Persons. Sir Peter Parker was Chairman of BR at the time and the British Railways Board included Tom Libby and wheelchair user Bill Buchanan, who was "Special Adviser on the Disabled".

Tom Libby and Bill Buchanan together with Sir Bert Massie (RADAR) were tasked to design and develop the Disabled Persons Railcard.

The Railcard initially cost £5. Its price increased to £14 in the 1990s and then in 2006 to £18. A three-year Railcard was also introduced in September 2006 at £48.

The price increased again in January 2011, to its current cost of £20 for a year. The three year railcard was increased the same year, costing £54 (£18 per year). As of March 2026, these prices are still in effect.

In March 2026, the criteria was extended. As part of this the treatment of physical health conditions and mental was equalised, with the introduction of the criteria "currently unable to drive on medical grounds."

== Qualifying disabilities ==
Applicants must submit evidence to show that their disability makes them eligible for a Disabled Persons Railcard.

A passenger is eligible for the Disabled Persons Railcard if they

- receive Personal Independence Payment (PIP) or Adult Disability Payment (ADP)
- receive Disability Living Allowance (DLA) or Child Disability Payment (CDP) at either:
  - the higher or lower rate for the mobility component
  - the higher or middle rate for the care component
- have a visual impairment
- have a hearing impairment
- have epilepsy
- receive Attendance Allowance, Severe Disablement Allowance or Pension Age Disability Payment (PADP)
- receive War Pensioner's Mobility Supplement
- receive War or Service Disablement Pension for 80% or more disability
- buy or lease a vehicle through the Motability scheme
- receive a Disabled Persons Bus Pass in England, Scotland or Wales
- receive a London Disabled Persons Freedom Pass
- have a Blue Badge
- are currently unable to drive on medical grounds
- receive Armed Forces Compensation Scheme (AFCS) benefits
- receive Industrial Injuries Benefit for 20% degree of disablement or higher
- are without speech

== Disabled people and trains ==
Historically, the design of most British trains did not enable wheelchair users to travel in the main passenger area. Passenger doors were too narrow and the fixed seating layout did not give wheelchair users space to manoeuvre. When wheelchair users could travel by rail, it was in the guard's van.

The introduction of High Speed Trains and sliding door carriages in the 1970s and 1980s, did much to improve access for disabled passengers, especially with wider doors and priority seating giving people more leg room.

The Disability Discrimination Act 1995 introduced design standards for the future design and construction of public transport vehicles. So, in November 1998 the Rail Vehicle Accessibility Regulations were introduced. These had a significant impact on the design of new trains and refurbishment of existing ones. Rail Vehicle Regulations also formed the basis of the TSI-PRM, a European standard for heavy rail vehicles accessibility.

== Issuing ==
In 2008, issuing arrangements moved to Scottish contact centre operator, Journeycall (part of the ESP Group), based in Arbroath. The Scottish based contact centre also provides a variety of different services for other Rail Delivery Group organisations as well as services for Transport for London and Transport for Wales. This move also saw the introduction of automated ticket issuing systems and increased call centre opening hours (available between 07.00 and 22.00 every day except Christmas Day).

Railcard holders are issued renewal reminders.

== Marketing ==
Management and marketing of the Railcard is led by the Disability & Inclusion and National Railcards teams at Rail Delivery Group in London.
