= 16–25 Railcard =

British Rail Discount Card

Pre-APTIS version of the Railcard, issued in 1985; the design had been largely unchanged since the Railcard was introduced. (Photograph obscured)

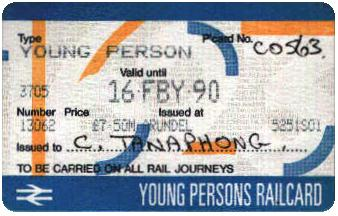
The second APTIS version, with abstract "1623" background reflecting the 16–23 age range; this Railcard has been issued at half price (£7.50 instead of £15.00) for an unknown reason.

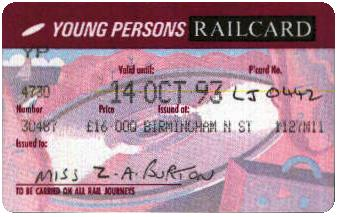
The third APTIS version

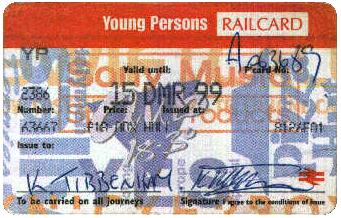
The fourth APTIS version, with updated version of the logo

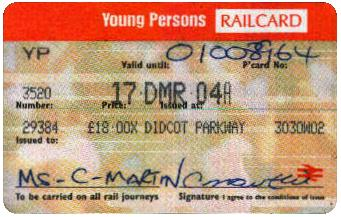
The fifth APTIS version

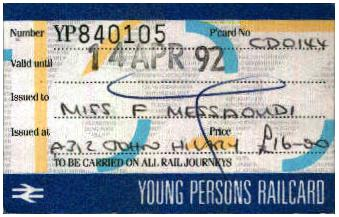
Handwritten Railcard issued at a Rail Appointed Travel Agent

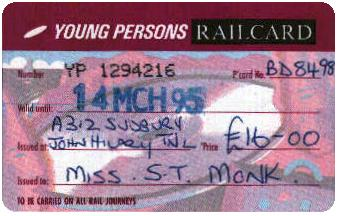
Another handwritten Agency example, this time in "APTIS" style

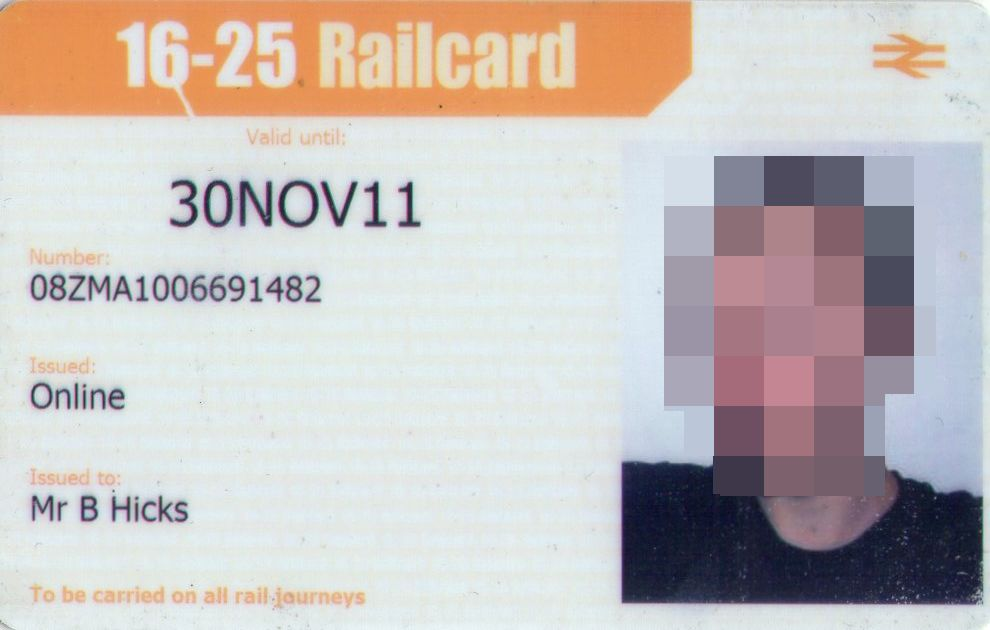
A three-year 16-25 Railcard issued online (Photograph obscured)

The 16–25 Railcard is an annual card giving discounts on certain types of railway ticket in Britain. It is available to anybody aged between 16 and 25 (inclusive), and certain mature students aged 26 and above, and is currently priced at £35.00 (as of March 2025). There is no restriction on the number of times the Railcard can be used to purchase discounted tickets during the period of its validity, and there are no geographical restrictions on its use.

Introduced in 1974 on an experimental basis, under the name Student Card, and expanded into the Student Railcard later that year, it was the first of the many Railcards which formed part of British Rail's array of concessionary fare schemes, and which still exist on the post-privatisation railway network. Later, it was rebranded as the Young Persons Railcard and, from 18 May 2008, the 16–25 Railcard.

== History ==
In the 1960s and 1970s, many new universities were opened in Britain, while car ownership was relatively low, especially among young people. Furthermore, internal flights were not as cheap or prevalent as they are now. Most students either hitched or took a long-distance coach. The National Union of Students (NUS) had a very large travel company at the time with charter flights all over the world. They wanted to expand their operations domestically and so went to various regional sales managers of British Railways to develop special fares for holders of NUS cards. These were usually an allocated number of seats on specified weekend trains but they were very successful and Paul Connellan, who was the Travel Company General Manager, went to the British Railways Board with a proposal to allow a general discount based on the NUS card. The railways management, led by Alan Chamberlain, were reluctant to offer a discount based just on such cards particularly as some colleges and universities were not members of the NUS. A compromise was agreed where a special card would be sold but only through student travel offices.

The first Student Card, as it was known, was launched. It exhibited some features which have remained consistent throughout the Railcard scheme's history, but also several which were later changed. It could only be purchased from National Union of Students (NUS) offices. Costing £1.65, which included a VAT charge of 8%, it was valid until a specific date—30 June 1974—rather than for a specific length of time. Only second class tickets could be bought, and all types of ticket were subject to a minimum fare below which no further discount would be given. The maximum discount was 50%. A booklet containing ten "Student Travel Request Forms" was supplied with the card; one had to be filled in and presented at the ticket office when booking a ticket.

This original scheme, which was intended as a trial, was changed and relaunched in October 1974 under the new name Student Railcard. Two of the inconvenient conditions of the trial version removed: Railcards could be bought at railway station ticket offices, and Travel Request Forms were no longer required: the passenger just had to show the Railcard when buying their ticket.

During the 1970s, the range of people who could buy the Railcard was expanded in stages; having at first been restricted to students in full-time education, it was made available to nurses, part-time students and, ultimately (in 1980) anybody between 14 and 24 years old inclusive. Since then, the age range boundaries have been altered twice. In September 1987, the lower boundary became 16 years old, as British Rail changed their age limit for child tickets from 14 to 16, while the upper age limit became 23. However, registered mature students older than this could now buy a Railcard. Then, on 29 May 1994, the upper age limit was increased to 25.

The use of the same expiry date for all cards issued in a given year persisted until 1982, although the fixed date was changed from 30 June to 30 September when the first version of the Student Railcard was launched in October 1974 (the original "Student Card" was the only version ever to use a 30 June expiry date). After 30 September 1982, Railcards were issued for a fixed period of 12 months from the date of issue. At the same time, the name Young Persons Railcard was adopted.

The next major changes came in 1987, with the discount structure, types of discounted tickets available and appearance of the Railcard all changing. With the introduction of the APTIS ticket issuing system happening at this time, a new set of ticket stock (with the British Rail form number BR 4599/20)^{A} was introduced. These were smaller than the erstwhile handwritten square-cornered card tickets, and had no room for a photograph to be attached; a separate Photocard, with a unique serial number was introduced instead. This was issued together with the Railcard, and had to be shown when buying subsequent Railcards and when travelling on discounted tickets.

Changes after this mostly involved the design of the APTIS ticket stock, the price of the Railcard and the minimum fare boundaries. However, two changes were also made to the method of buying the Railcard. From 9 January 2000, Telesales offices operated by the train operating companies were able to sell Railcards, although if a Photocard was not already held, one had to be issued at a station or travel agency within one month (a temporary pass, entitled Temporary Facility – Permit to Travel without Photocard was issued in lieu by the Telesales office). In August 2006, online booking of Railcards was made available, although the card can still be bought through train stations and over the phone. Booking online includes the option of a three-year railcard for £70.

From 18 May 2008 the card was rebranded as the 16–25 Railcard in order to make it easier to understand who is eligible for the card.

The 16–25 digital Railcard was announced in September 2015 and was available for purchase in 2017. Existing customers were unable to upgrade their physical railcard to a digital version, instead having to wait for their physical railcard to expire. The railcard was designed to reduce the number of people incurring fines for forgetting their railcard and remove the wait for obtaining a physical railcard in the post or at a station. A phone can display the railcard without an active internet connection, as long as the device had connected to the internet in the past 72 hours.

== Ticket types and discounts ==
The first version of the Railcard, the "Student Card" of 1974, gave 50% discounts on Second Class Single and Ordinary Return fares, as they were then known. (Ordinary Returns were valid for travel at all times, and the return journey could take place on a later date. They later became "Standard Returns", and are now known as "Anytime Returns".) The higher-rate minimum fare (see Price and minimum fare below) applied to Ordinary Returns, while the lower-rate fare was used as the baseline for other fares.

A 50% discount on Day Returns (valid at all times, for return on the same day) and Off Peak Day Returns (valid outside peak hours, again for return on the same day) was available from 30 September 1978. Other fares added later included the London Saver (1981; this type of ticket is no longer available) and Saver (12 May 1985; the discount on these was one-third). The main change, however, came on 1 March 1987, when the set of discounts was changed as follows:

- one-third off Saver, Standard Single, Standard Return, Standard Day Return and Cheap Day Return tickets
- one-third Rail Rovers of all types
- one-third One Day Capitalcards from stations outside the Capitalcard zonal area, subject to a £2.00 minimum fare
- £2.00 flat charge for One Day Capitalcards from stations within the zonal area

The One Day Capitalcard became the One Day Travelcard in 1989, and as from April 1993 only all-zone tickets (Zones 1–6) could be purchased at a discount, again subject to a minimum fare restriction. As of 2010, this is £5.00.

Although other minor changes have been made since, mainly to the names of ticket types, this range of discounts is very similar to that which applies as of 2007:

- one-third off Cheap Day Singles and Cheap Day Returns
- one-third off Standard Day Singles and Standard Day Returns (subject to minimum fare)
- one-third off Standard Open Singles and Standard Open Returns (subject to minimum fare)
- one-third off Saver and Supersaver Singles and Returns
- one-third off many types of Advance Purchase ticket, both generic (SuperAdvance) and train operating company-specific
- one-third off Network AwayBreaks

As of 2 January 2008, for people using public transport in London, the discount can be loaded on to an Oyster card at any London Underground ticket machine (with help from a member of staff), providing the one-third discount off the cost of a One Day Travelcard and the Oyster automatic daily cap. From 2010 discounted paper tickets have been suspended in the Transport for London zoned area. An Oyster card loaded with the railcard can be used to obtain one-third reduction on Off Peak single National Rail fares in the area or the Off Peak Cap rate. From January 2011, this discount also applies to off-peak single fares on the Tube, DLR and London Overground.

Avanti West Coast waives peak time restrictions on certain services where a railcard has been used to discount the ticket.

== Price and minimum fare ==
The Railcard has undergone regular price increases since its introduction, and as of 2 March 2025 has cost £35.00. A VAT charge was included until 1976. Railcards for mature students have always cost the same as those for people within the standard age range.

From the beginning, discounted tickets bought with the Railcard were subject to a "minimum fare", although its level and the circumstances in which it was applied have varied considerably over time. For the first 4½ years, until 15 September 1978, minimum fares applied at all times; if the price of the ticket including the full discount was lower than the relevant minimum fare level, the latter would be charged and the full discount would not be given. For example, if the date was June 1974, the journey in question was a "Higher rate" Ordinary Return and its published full fare was £1.30, the passenger would be charged the £1.00 minimum fare, because the discounted fare would be lower than this (50% discount = £1.30 ÷ 2 = £0.65). If the £1.30 fare was on a "Lower Rate" ticket, however, the full discount would be applied, as the minimum fare for lower-rate tickets (£0.50) was less than the discounted fare (£0.65).

From 15 September 1978, minimum fares no longer applied at weekends, on bank holidays or at any time during July and August; at these times, the full 50% discount was applied to all available ticket types, no matter how low the resulting discounted fare became. On 1 September 1980, minimum fares no longer applied after 6.00pm on weekdays; and in 1986, this was changed to 10.00am. The latter condition remains in force today, meaning that the full discount is available at all times except in the morning peak (before 10.00am). Weekends, bank holidays, July and August are still unrestricted.

From 17 May 2009, minimum fares were standardised at £12 for both single and return journeys before 10.00am. Cards were also entitled to discount on First Class advance fares and Anytime Day Travelcards.

This section of the 16–25 Railcard website explains the current (as of 2008) minimum fare regulations.

Effective from	Price	Minimum fare:		Notes
Effective from	Price	Higher rate	Lower rate	Notes
January 1974	£1.65	£1.00	£0.50	Included VAT @ 8%
1 July 1974	Unknown	£1.20	£0.60	
1 October 1975	£5.40	£2.00	£1.00	Included VAT @ 8%
1 October 1976	Unknown	£2.50	£1.25	
1 October 1977	£7.00	£3.00	£1.50	
15 September 1978	£7.00	£3.50	£1.75	First minimum fare rule relaxation
15 September 1979	£8.00	£4.00	£2.00	
1 September 1980	£10.00	£4.00	£2.00	Second minimum fare rule relaxation
4 October 1982	£10.00	£6.00	£3.00	Renamed Young Persons Railcard at this time
19 June 1983	£12.00	£6.00	£3.00	
10 January 1988	£15.00	£6.00	£3.00	
7 January 1990	£16.00	£6.00	£3.00	
6 January 1991	£16.00	£8.00	£4.00	
11 January 1993	£16.00	£12.00	£6.00	
17 August 1997	£18.00	£12.00	£6.00	
26 September 1999	£18.00	£14.00	£7.00	
23 May 2004	£20.00	£16.00	£8.00	
2 January 2008	£24.00	£16.00	£8.00	
18 May 2008	£24.00	£16.00	£8.00	Renamed 16–25 Railcard at this time
17 May 2009	£26.00	£12.00	£12.00	
28 May 2011	£28.00	£12.00	£12.00	
19 May 2013	£30.00	£12.00	£12.00	
2 March 2025	£35.00	£12.00	£12.00	

The three-year online only railcard was introduced in 2008, and cost £65. The price was raised to £70 on 19 May 2013, and increased further to £80 on 2 March 2025.

== Tickets issued with a Railcard ==
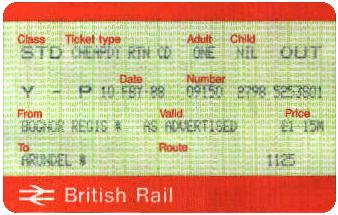
The Y - P variation, seen from the introduction of APTIS and PORTIS in 1986 until early 1988.

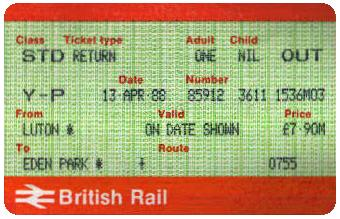
Early version of the Y-P rendering of the status code. This version is still seen on all ticket issuing systems today.

On the APTIS, PORTIS/SPORTIS and other computerised ticket issuing systems, a "status code" field is provided on each ticket issued. This is left blank if an adult is travelling at full (undiscounted) fare; but if any discount or other special condition applies, a code of up to five letters appears.

The change of name from "Student Railcard" to "Young Persons Railcard" preceded the introduction of these systems by four years, so the status code used has always taken the form Y-P. However, in the earliest days of APTIS and PORTIS, this code was rendered Y - P, with spaces between the letters and the dash. Since 1988, Y-P has always been used — both on the now defunct APTIS and SPORTIS (the successor to PORTIS) and on the various New Generation systems introduced since privatisation. In late 2014, the status code 16-25 started to be used, 26 years after its introduction.

== Railcards as an incentive to open a bank account ==
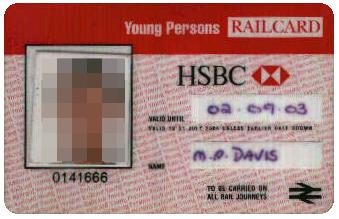
A four-year HSBC Railcard, valid between September 1999 and September 2003. (Photograph obscured)

In recent years, as a marketing initiative, British banks HSBC, NatWest and Santander have offered free multi-year Railcards to students opening new bank accounts. HSBC held the exclusive contract from 1997 to 2004, between 2004 and 2013 it was held by NatWest, and Santander won the contract in 2013.

Midland Bank, a part of HSBC since 1992, introduced a free four-year Railcard on 7 July 1997. It was available to any first-year undergraduate who opened a new account with the bank. The card had a red colour scheme, bore the holder's photograph and a handwritten expiry date, and was made of thin plastic rather than card. Minor layout changes were made when Midland Bank was rebranded as HSBC in 1999. A generic seven-digit serial number was shown on the front.

NatWest signed a deal on 7 June 2004 for the exclusive right to offer Railcards as parts of its own incentive package. A five-year version was offered (which was effectively worth £100, given that a one-year Railcard bought in the normal way cost £20.00) as from 21 June 2004. For a short period, until 1 September 2004, both NatWest five-year and HSBC four-year Railcards were available; but from that date, NatWest gained the exclusive rights and the HSBC version ceased to be available. NatWest ceased to offer the railcard to new accounts in 2011, however existing account holders continued to be reissued with renewed cards until 2013.

Santander has issued railcards to new student current account holders since summer 2013

The overall appearance and layout of the NatWest Railcard was similar to that of the HSBC version. A six-digit serial number prefixed by NWB was used, however; and the card has a standard form number in the "4599" series (RSP 4599/294), whereas the Midland Bank (RSP 24881/5) and HSBC (RSP 24881/7) versions were allocated non-standard codes.

The bank Railcards are used in the same way as standard, paid-for Railcards: the same range of tickets is available at the same discounts, and subject to the same terms and conditions.
