= Transport Focus =

Transport Focus is the statutory watchdog for transport passengers and road users in Great Britain, with offices in London and Manchester. It was named the Rail Passengers Council until January 2006 when renamed Passenger Focus. It was renamed again in March 2015 as Transport Focus. It is an executive non-departmental public body, sponsored by the Department for Transport.
