= Travelcard =

Ticket for the London local transport

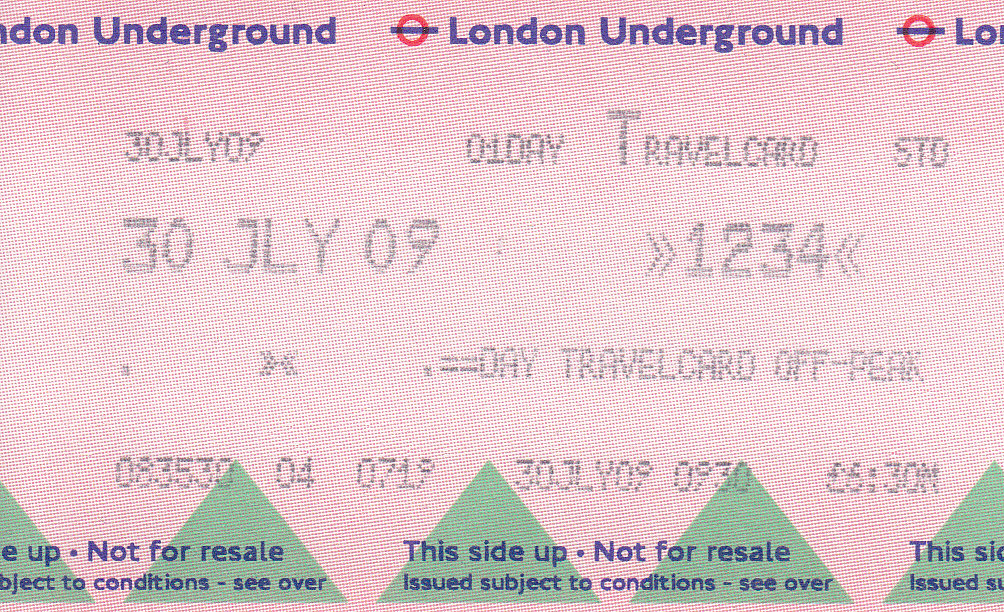
- A paper Travelcard issued on London Underground ticket stock
- Location: Greater London
- Launched: May 1983
- Technology: Magnetic stripe; Oyster card
- Manager: Transport for London
- Currency: Pound sterling
- Validity: London Underground (1983); London Buses (1983); National Rail (1985); Docklands Light Railway (1987); London Trams (2000); London Overground (2007); Elizabeth line (2022)
- Retailed: Online; Telephone; Newsagents; Stations
- Variants: Anytime Travelcard; Off-Peak Travelcard
- Website: http://www.tfl.gov.uk/

The Travelcard is an inter-modal travel ticket for unlimited use on the London Underground, London Overground, Elizabeth line, Docklands Light Railway, London Trams, London Buses and National Rail services in the Greater London area. Travelcards can be purchased for a period of time varying from one day to a year, from Transport for London, National Rail and their agents. Depending on where it is purchased, and the length of validity, a Travelcard is either printed on a paper ticket with a magnetic stripe or encoded onto an Oyster card, Transport for London's contactless electronic smart card, or an ITSO smartcard issued by a National Rail train operating company. The cost of a Travelcard is determined by the area it covers and, for this purpose, London is divided into a number of fare zones. The Travelcard season ticket for unlimited travel on London Buses and the London Underground was launched on 22 May 1983 by London Transport. One Day Travelcards and validity on other transport modes were added from 1984 onwards. The introduction of the Travelcard caused an increase in patronage and reduced the number of tickets that needed to be purchased by passengers.

== History ==
Poster advertising the January 1985 launch of the Capitalcard ticket

Before the introduction of the Travelcard, tickets for the London Underground were purchased on a 'point-to-point' basis between two stations, either as a single, return or season ticket; and were priced according to distance travelled. Tickets for travel on London Buses and British Rail were purchased separately. The Travelcard was introduced as the third in a series of major fare revisions that had started in 1981. The introduction of the Travelcard was intended to increase patronage on London Underground and London Buses, particularly during less busy times and to speed up the boarding of bus services.

On 4 October 1981, following the Greater London Council election, the incoming Labour administration simplified fares in Greater London by introducing four new bus fare zones and two central London Underground zones, named City and West End, where flat fares applied for the first time. This was accompanied by a cut in prices of about a third and was marketed as the Fares Fair campaign. Following successful legal action against it, on 21 March 1982 London Bus fares were doubled and London Underground fares increased by 91%. The two central area zones were retained and the fares to all other stations were restructured to be graduated at three-mile intervals; and thus grouping those stations within three miles of the central zones in an 'inner zone'.

In 1983, a third revision of fares was undertaken, and a new inter-modal Travelcard season ticket was launched covering five new numbered zones; representing an overall cut in prices of around 25%. The One Day Travelcard was launched in 1984 and on weekdays was only sold for travel after 09:30. In January 1985 the Capitalcard season ticket was launched, offering validity on British Rail services as well as London Underground and London Buses. It was priced around 10–15% higher than the Travelcard. The card was marketed under the brand "The London Connection", illustrated with an image of an electric plug bringing together the corporate identities of British Rail and London Transport. In June 1986 the One Day Capitalcard was launched. The Capitalcard brand ended in January 1989 when the Travelcard gained validity on British Rail and DLR services. In January 1991 Zone 5 was split to create a new Zone 6.

In January 2002 a peak version of the One Day Travelcard was introduced on weekdays, which allows travel between 04:30 and 09:30 and in 2005 a 3-day version of the Travelcard was launched (they were discontinued in 2010). Travelcard season tickets were made available on electronic smart cards, known as Oyster cards, from 2003 and by 2005 Transport for London ceased selling season tickets on paper tickets, although they continued to be available from National Rail stations until 1 June 2022.

In July 2023, TfL and the Mayor of London announced that from January 2024, one day Travelcards would no longer be sold or accepted on the TfL network, citing unfavourable revenue sharing terms between TfL and the Train Operating Companies on which the tickets are valid. 7-day and longer Travelcards will be unaffected. However, in October 2023, it was announced that due to a renegotiation on revenue sharing, one day Travelcards would be retained.

== Operation ==
=== Usage ===
A Travelcard entitles the holder to unlimited travel in Greater London on London Buses, London Trams, London Underground, London Overground, Docklands Light Railway, Elizabeth line and National Rail services. They provide travel within up to nine numbered concentric zones, with Zone 1 (which includes the central areas of The City and the West End) at the middle and Zone 9 (which includes suburbs outside Greater London such as Amersham and Brentwood). On the London Underground, London Overground, DLR and National Rail, the Travelcard is only valid within the zones indicated on the ticket. On London Buses any Travelcard, regardless of the zones, can be used on any route. On Tramlink any Travelcard valid in zones 3, 4, 5, or 6 can be used on any tram route. Travelcards are sold in a limited number of combinations of adjacent zones with different combinations available depending on the length of validity. Travelcards for only one zone are no longer sold, having been withdrawn in 2006. Travelcards valid for travel in Zone 1 (most of central London) are more expensive than those excluding it, although as of 2011 one-day travelcards not including Zone 1 are no longer sold.

Travelcards are issued for periods of one day or seven days, or for any period from one month to one year, known as a season Travelcard. One day Travelcards can be purchased in Anytime and Off-Peak variants. Anytime Travelcard and Off-peak Travelcard. An Anytime Travelcard may be used from 00:01 on the date of validity and an Off-peak Travelcard may be used from 09:30 on Monday to Friday, and whole day on weekends and public holidays, with both expiring at 04:29 the following day.

Travelcards for seven days or longer are known as season tickets and allow travel at any time of the day. When bought at a London Underground station or other Transport for London agent, one day Travelcards are sold on a paper ticket with a magnetic stripe and Travelcards lasting seven days or more are loaded on to an Oyster card. A monthly travelcard (valid for between 28 and 31 days depending on month) is sold for 3.84 times the price of a 7-day card, while annual travelcards are sold for the price of 40 7-day tickets. The price of a travelcard valid for between one month and one year will be the sum of the relevant number of months, plus a pro-rata monthly rate for the number of days in the final month. As 40 weekly tickets cost approximately the same as a 10-month-12-day ticket, it is not possible in practice to buy a travelcard for a period between 10 months 13 days and 1 year, as an annual pass is cheaper and will be issued anyway.

As of 2022, Anytime Travelcard is only sold for zones 1–4, 1–6 or 1–9, while off-peak Travelcard is only sold for zones 1–6 or 1–9. Travelcard season tickets are sold for any consecutive zone combinations including at least 2 consecutive zones within 1–6, with tickets including zone 1 significantly more expensive, while season tickets for the outer zones are offered in the combinations 1–7, 1–8, 1–9, 2–7, 2–9 (including Watford Junction), 4–7 and 4–9 (including Watford Junction) only.

=== Sale ===
A Travelcard can be bought either from TfL or from National Rail:

- TfL-issued One Day Travelcards are sold at ticket machines at London Underground / DLR stations, TfL Visitor Centres, or Tramlink shop in Croydon, in form as a paper ticket only.
- National Rail issued One Day Travelcards are sold at ticket offices at National Rail stations, or bought from National Rail ticket retailers and collected at National Rail ticket machines / ticket offices and sold as a paper ticket. Some National Rail retailers also offer the option to load them into a National Rail ITSO smart card.
- A Travelcard season ticket can be bought from TfL at ticket machines at London Underground / DLR stations, TfL Visitor Centres, Oyster ticket shops, or online at the TfL Oyster Account, which must be loaded into an Oyster card at the point of purchase (or afterwards if bought online).
- A Travelcard season ticket can be sold by National Rail retailers and loaded into National Rail smart cards. As of 2022, an inboundary Travelcard season ticket (one valid within the numbered zones only) is sold on smart cards only, which include Oyster card (if sold by TfL) and National Rail ITSO smart cards (if sold by National Rail). Outboundary Travelcard season tickets sold by National Rail, which include travel within the numbered zones and between the zones and the specified station(s) outside the zone, remain available on paper tickets.

Only Travelcards sold as National Rail tickets are valid for 2-for-1 offers at attractions in London. The exception is one-year Travelcards on an Oyster card which are also valid as they come with a Gold Record Card, but shorter Travelcards on an Oyster card are not.

=== Services outside Greater London ===
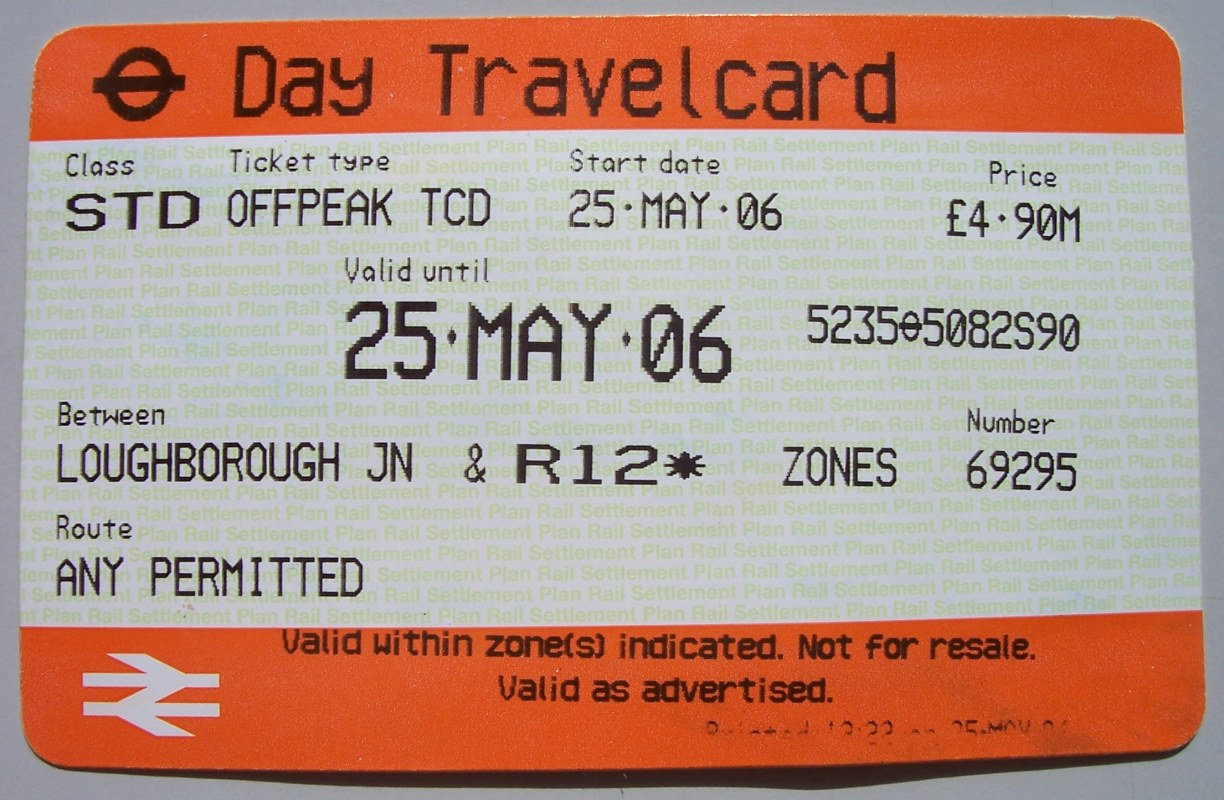
One Day Travelcard issued at a National Rail outlet

There are various services outside Greater London on which Travelcards can be used. There are some London Underground, London Overground, Elizabeth line and National Rail stations located in the Home Counties of Essex, Hertfordshire, Buckinghamshire, Surrey and Kent which are included in fare zones 4 to 9. A Travelcard covering the appropriate zones are valid for unlimited travel to/from these stations. Additionally, on some London Buses services that cross the Greater London boundary, Travelcards are valid for the whole route.

From outside the London fare zones, outboundary Travelcards can be bought from some stations to a combination of London Zones, including zone 6, as either a day ticket or season ticket. An outboundary day Travelcard can be used to make one outward journey from the origin station to the boundary of zone 6, then one return journey back to the origin on the same day, with unlimited travel allowed within the zones shown on the ticket. Railway ticket barriers outside zone 6 will often retain the day ticket once the return journey has been made even though the travelcard part of the ticket remains valid until 04:30 the following day within the zone 6 boundary. An outboundary Travelcard season ticket can be used for unlimited travel between the origin and destination, and also the within zones specified on the ticket.

In addition, Travelcards between Zone 1, 2 or 4 and Watford Junction, Zone 1 or 2 and Hertford East / Broxbourne, and Zone 1 or 2 and Shenfield are also available on Oyster cards, with a Travelcard for Hertford East / Broxbourne also including Watford Junction, and a Travelcard for Shenfield also including Watford Junction and Hertford East / Broxbourne as well.

Furthermore, Travelcard ticket holders needing to go outside the covered zones can buy a "Boundary Zone" ticket, used in conjunction with the Travelcard. Such tickets are little known and can only be bought from ticket offices and some ticket machines, and a limited number of online retailers, as a result, many travellers, not realising that these tickets can be bought, ended up buying other more expensive tickets for their journeys. A class action lawsuit has been filed against the train companies requesting a total of £93 million in compensation. The case was dismissed in October 2025.

=== Exceptions ===
Although located in Zone 6, travel by Heathrow Express from Heathrow Central, Heathrow Terminal 4 or Heathrow Terminal 5 to London Paddington station is not included. The historical Heathrow Connect service did not accept Travelcards at the airport either; they could be used on the rest of its route between Hayes & Harlington and Paddington, but when this route was replaced by TfL Rail and later the Elizabeth line, this restriction was dropped and Travelcards are now usable there.

Travel on the High Speed 1 rail link between London St Pancras and Stratford International is also not included unless the travelcard is marked "plus high speed" This is because High Speed 1 is considered to be "outside the zones" except for London St Pancras station.

=== Revenue allocation ===
The revenues from Travelcard sales are divided according to a scheme agreed by Transport for London and the Rail Delivery Group. A quarterly survey known as the Travelcard Diary Survey is undertaken, where travelcard holders are asked to record all the bus, rail and tube trips they have made using their travelcard. Both "in-boundary" and "out-boundary" (i.e. Travelcards in or outside the zonal areas) are surveyed, as well as day and monthly, weekly and annual Travelcards. Ensuring that a statistically valid sample that will give a fair and accurate allocation presents a challenge. The average mileage recorded on each mode is then calculated to give allocation factors of the Travelcard revenue to tube, bus and rail.

=== Additional benefits ===
Travelcards entitle the holder to a 33% discount on scheduled London River Services and 25% on the London Cable Car. In addition, holders of annual travelcards receive a "gold record card" which offers savings on off-peak travel on the same basis as the National Rail annual gold card.

Travelcards issued on paper tickets at National Rail stations are also treated as 'train tickets' for the Days Out Guide 2-for-1 offers at most attractions participating in the scheme.

== See also ==
- Navigo pass similar to Travelcard, used in Île de France
- Creditrans similar to Travelcard, used in the Greater Bilbao region.
