= APTIS =

Ticket system used in the UK

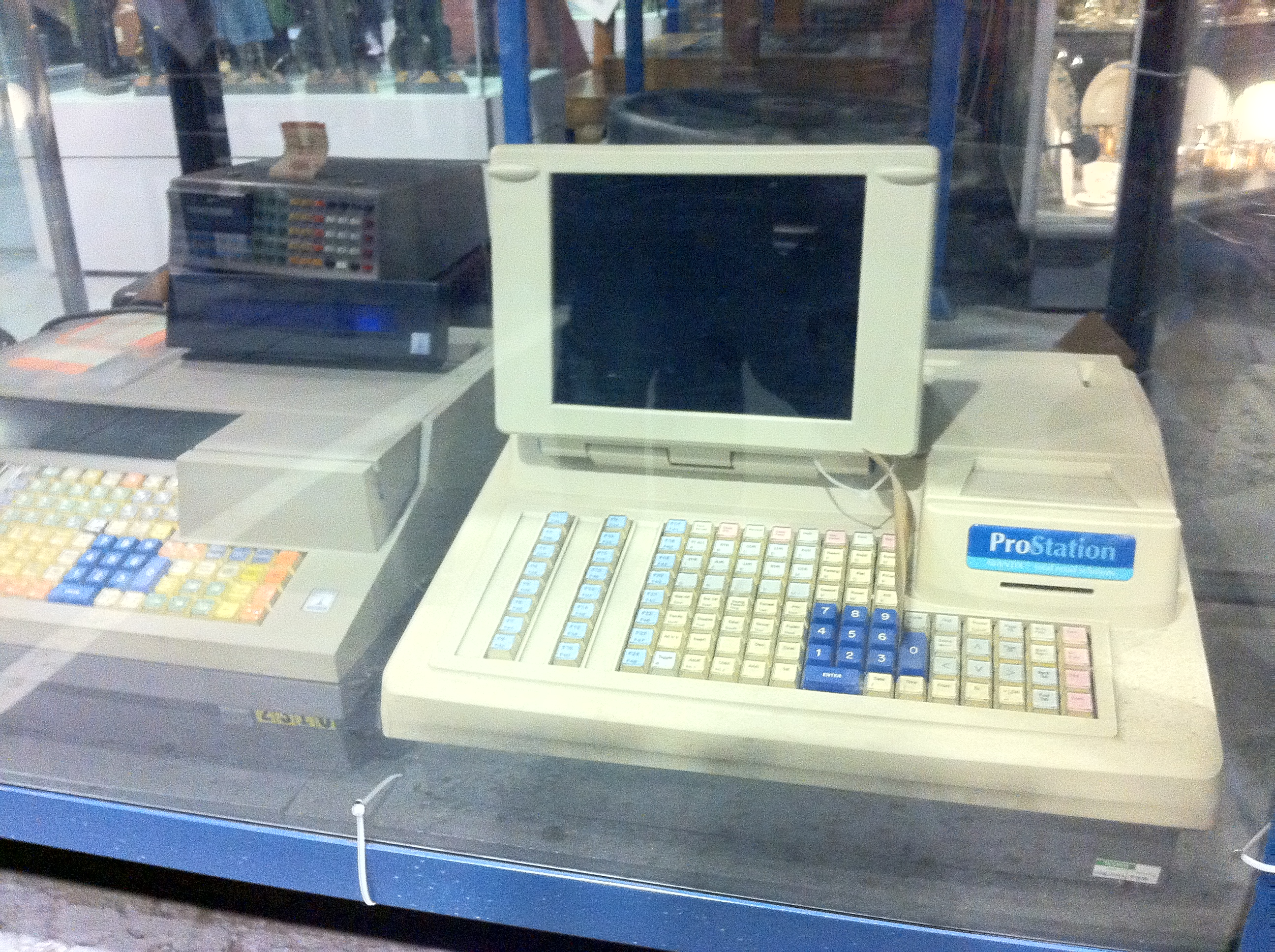
- Aptis ProStation next to an Aptis machine at the National Railway Museum, York

System information
- Full name: All Purpose Ticket Issuing System
- Machine type: Ticket Office-based
- Type of ticket stock: Manual/Hopper-fed
- Manufacturer: Thorn EMI, Wells

History
- First introduced: October 1986
- Machine number range: 2000-5168
- Window number range: Upwards from 01; Downwards from 99 (spare machines)
- Machines in use: 2,971 (maximum historic figure); 3 (as of March 2007)

Locations/areas/train operating companies
- Current users: none
- Former users: Before privatisation: All passenger sectors of British Rail; After privatisation: All train operating companies

APTIS was the Accountancy and Passenger Ticket Issuing System used on the British Rail/National Rail network until 2007. It was originally called "Advanced Passenger Ticket Issuing System" as it was being developed at the time of the Advanced Passenger Train.

It was widely known as the All-Purpose Ticket-Issuing System, a description which was used during the development of the prototype devices. It led to the introduction, on the national railway, of a new standardised machine-printable ticket, the APTIS ticket, which replaced the Edmondson railway ticket first introduced in the 1840s.

== Design ==
APTIS issued impact printed tickets on credit-card sized card ticket stock, with a magnetic stripe on the centre of the reverse which could be encoded to operate ticket barriers; it could also use plain non-magnetic ticket stock.

APTIS could issue receipts for passengers paying by debit card or credit card. These receipts were a combination of a transparent carbonless copy paper top copy, for the customer; and a backing card, for retention by British Rail. The customer signed the receipt, handed it back; and, in return, was given the signed top copy and the train tickets.

== History ==
=== Adoption by British Rail ===
APTIS was derived from a private venture ticketing system, the General Purpose ticket-issuing system, developed by Thorn EMI in 1978. It had 25 kB of memory. British Rail invited 23 firms to tender for a ticket-issuing system and Thorn EMI was successful. The first prototype was installed at Portsmouth & Southsea on 11 November 1982.

APTIS, along with the portable system PORTIS, was adopted as part of British Rail's £31 million investment, which was authorised in 1983. The production APTIS machines had 300 kB of memory; this could be upgraded to 500 kB. Some 2,971 APTIS machines were scheduled to be installed at 1,600 staffed British Rail stations between August 1985 and September 1987.

The first production APTIS tickets were issued in October 1986 at stations including Didcot Parkway and Abbey Wood; the official launch was by Transport Minister David Mitchell at the British Rail Travel Centre, Regent Street, London, on 18 November 1986. The first ticket was sold at Benfleet in January 1987.

In 1988, the last of British Rail's Edmondson printing presses, located at the Paper and Printing Centre, Crewe, shut down. The last station to sell Edmondson tickets prior to full APTIS conversion was Emerson Park, on Network SouthEast's Romford to Upminster Line, on 29 June 1989.

=== Phase-out of APTIS ===
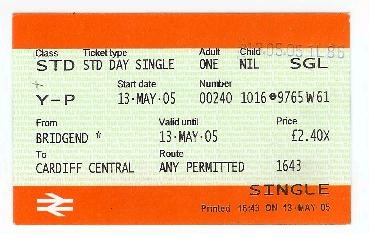
A ticket printed by an Ascom EasyTicket machine to a similar design to APTIS tickets.

APTIS survived in widespread use for twenty years, but in the early 2000s was largely replaced by more modern PC based ticketing systems although some APTIS were modified as APTIS-ANT (with no obvious difference to the ticket issued) Oyster card compatible machines in the Greater London area. The last APTIS machines were removed at the end of 2006 as there was no option to upgrade for accepting Chip and PIN credit-card payments. The last APTIS-ANT ticket to be issued in the UK using one of the machines was at Upminster station on 21 March 2007.

Although APTIS is no longer used, most National Rail tickets are printed to a similar design (Standard New Generation). On the original APTIS tickets, the field describers such as "Class" and "Ticket type" were pre-printed on the ticket stock, but now all information is printed on the stock by the issuing machine. A new design of ticket was introduced from March 2014.

== Features ==
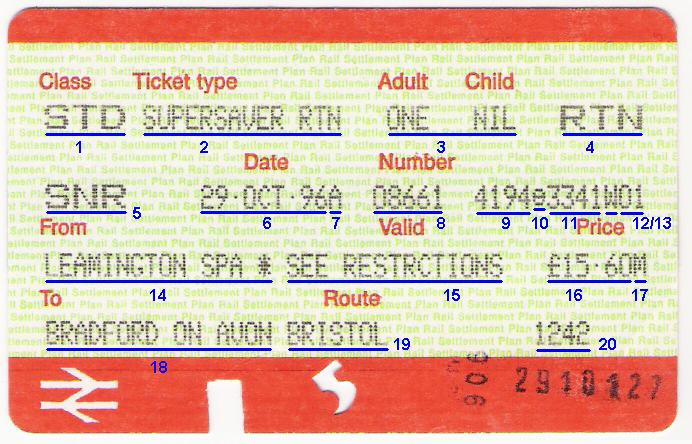
An APTIS travel ticket from Leamington Spa to Bradford-on-Avon. The table below references the numbered information.

=== Colours ===
The coloured bands at the top and bottom varied as follows:

- Orange: standard tickets (Rail Settlement Plan No 9399)
- Green: Weekly season ticket
- Grey or blue: Monthly or longer, but not annual, season ticket (stronger material)
- Gold: Annual season ticket (stronger material)

=== Information ===
APTIS ticket features
No.	Feature	Options (Note: If "e.g." is shown, the listed examples are a non-exclusive list; if it is not, the listed examples are exclusive.)	Notes
1	Class of travel	1ST; 2ND; STD	Second Class was renamed Standard Class in 1988, changing the abbreviation from 2ND to STD.
2	Ticket type	e.g. SUPERSAVER RTN	Up to sixteen characters. SUPERSAVER RTN was a common type: a cheap-rate ticket for longer journeys, valid for one month but with time restrictions. Hundreds of different ticket types have been seen; many have been short-lived.
3	Number of passengers	e.g.: EIGHT; 12***	Usually only one adult or one child per ticket (hence the headings in the singular). Group tickets can be issued for any number and combination: the number is shown in words up to NINE, but above this figures are used (for example, 17***, with asterisks to prevent fraudulent filling of spaces with other numbers).
4	Portion indicator	SGL; OUT; RTN; OUT&RTN; (Note: Special tickets only)	Travel tickets can be singles (SGL), the outward portion of a return (OUT) or the return portion of a return (RTN). Some tickets issued for special trains and charters were single-portion returns showing OUT&RTN, although ordinary tickets for scheduled services were never issued in this format. In the illustrated example, this is the journey back to Bradford-on-Avon. The distinction between the two portions of a return ticket is required because certain ticket types have different restrictions for the outward and return portions. For example, Savers allow a break of journey on the return portion, but not the outward portion; also the outward portion must be on the date shown, but the return portion can be on days within a month of the date shown. Clause 17 of the National Rail Conditions of Carriage states that "A return ticket (including a two-part return ticket) is only valid for the outward journey shown on that ticket if the ticket is completely unused. You may not use the outward part of a return ticket after you have used the return part." This is to prevent the 'reversing' of tickets where a cheaper ticket can be bought by travelling in the opposite direction (e.g. purchasing a return OUT of London, when actually travelling in to London).
5	Status code	e.g. CHILD	See also: Concessionary fares on the British railway network Any form of concession causing the fare to be reduced will be shown here – examples are: CHILD; SNR (SNRCZ on early APTIS) – Senior Railcard; NSE – Network Railcard; Y-P or 16 – 25 (Y – P on early APTIS) – Young Persons Railcard; PRIV – railway staff privilege card; CHPRV – privilege card for dependent child of railway staff; LACON – various local authority concessions; NDEAL – New Deal Photocard; GOLDC – Annual Gold card; HMF – HM Forces Railcard; CHHMF – Child Dependent of HM Forces Railcard Holder
6	Date	e.g. 06.JLY.1994	Always in DD.MMM.YY format, where MMM is a three-letter abbreviation of the month's name. Non-standard abbreviations were used for some of the months (January, February, March, July, and December), in order to make it harder to fraudulently alter a ticket's validity. The month codes were: JNR, FBY, MCH, APR, MAY, JUN, JLY, AUG, SEP, OCT, NOV, DMR.
7	Advance dating indicator	A	If an A is present next to the date, the ticket was bought before the date of travel. Standard travel tickets can be bought up to one year in advance.
8	Serial number	e.g. 07734	A number unique to each individual transaction. OUT and RET pairs of tickets have the same number – in the above example, the OUT ticket from Bradford-on-Avon to Leamington Spa would also be numbered 08661.
9	Machine number	e.g. 4489	A number unique to that machine – when a machine changes location, it retains this number. The lowest-numbered APTIS machine was 2000 (which was still in use until July 2006 – at Northolt Park, on the Chiltern Railways network – making it one of the last machines still in place), and the range continued with very few gaps through to 5168. A few machine numbers were never used. The order of numbering did not seem to depend on the machine build date; the mid-3000 range was used on the very earliest machines.
10	Magnetic strip encoding indicator	θ	The theta symbol (θ) began to appear on APTIS tickets around late 1988, indicating that the magnetic strip on the reverse was encoded with data, allowing the ticket to operate the automatic barriers that were being installed at London Underground stations at the time. Such barriers are now in common use at National Rail stations as well.
11	National location code	e.g. 3341	The National Location Code (NLC) of the station or issuing point at which the machine is based. Because APTIS tickets can be issued remotely, i.e. from a station other than the machine's "home" location, checking the NLC is the only way to confirm where a ticket was issued.
12	Region letter	B; E; H; M; S; W	Shows the historic region with which the NLC is associated: E – Eastern; H – Scottish; M – London Midland; S – Southern; W – Western; B was sometimes used for travel centre, telesales or travel agency locations. As sectorisation had happened by the time APTIS was introduced, regional had lost some of their relevance.
13	Window number	e.g. 02	The first machine at a location would be numbered 01, with subsequent machines being 02, 03 and so on. Spare machines were allocated to some of the larger stations on the network for use in case of machine breakdowns at that station or nearby ones, or for use in accounting, barcode-scanning, training and similar; these were numbered downwards from 99 (very few stations had more than two). At stations equipped with modern issuing systems (such as Fujitsu STAR), the window numbers often begin higher than 01, for example at 30.
14	"From" station	e.g. HARPENDEN*	Station of origin for that portion of the journey. Restricted to sixteen characters. An asterisk was placed after names of less than fifteen characters, to prevent fraudulent amendments to station names (for example, CAMBRIDGE to CAMBRIDGE HEATH).
15	Validity indicator	e.g. AS ADVERTISED	A description of the conditions of validity, again to a maximum of sixteen characters. Tickets whose validity restrictions were complex, as in this example, showed SEE RESTRCTIONS (originally SEE RESTRICTNS) or AS ADVERTISED, depending on the ticket type; other common examples were ON DATE SHOWN, THREE DAYS and ONE MONTH.
16	Fare paid	e.g. £10.30	Almost all fares were in multiples of £0.05. Rounding was done in the passenger's favour: for example, a Railcard discount of one-third would be rounded to 34% (i.e. 66% of the full fare), downwards to the nearest £0.05. In fact, APTIS could apply any whole discount from 1% up to 99% and it was how the various companies decided what discount to apply e.g. Senior Citizen at 33%. This discount routine also introduced Privilege Fares based on current charges and allowed return fares to be used where previously only single fares had been the basis for charging.
17	Payment method	M; Q; W; Z	As follows: M: cash; Q: cheque; W: Railway Warrant or Rail Travel Voucher; X: credit, debit or charge card
18	Destination	e.g. DARLINGTON*	Destination station for that portion of the journey. Restricted to sixteen characters, with the asterisk used to fill space as before.
19	Route	e.g. NOT CAMBRIDGE*	Again restricted to sixteen characters. Hundreds of routes exist, but most are either "positive" restrictions (specifying a station to travel via) or "negative" restrictions (specifying stations to avoid). Often, more than one route would be available for a journey, with fares being different for each. In the illustrated example, the journey must be made via BRISTOL. An example of a "negative" restriction applicable to this journey would be NOT READING. Restrictions limiting travel on a certain TOC also exist; for example, a Standard Open Return between BIRMINGHAM STNS and LONDON TERMINALS could be issued with route CENTRAL/SILVLINK, allowing travel on Central Trains and Silverlink only. A dagger (†; described in publications as a "Maltese cross") may appear before the route if the ticket is valid for a cross-London journey on the London Underground. If there is nothing else to enter here, then ANY PERMITTED appears.
20	Time of issue	e.g. 1801	The time of issue of the ticket, in 24-hour mode. The letters MIN may appear to the right of here if the ticket has had a minimum fare applied.

== See also ==
- APTIS ticket features
- PORTIS
