= PORTIS/SPORTIS =

PORTIS (Portable Operated Ticket Issuing System) and latterly SPORTIS were portable ticket issuing systems used on Rail transport in Great Britain from 1982 until 2006. The system was also formerly used by Northern Ireland Railways for the issue of all tickets, including at railway station booking offices.

== PORTIS ==
These machines were developed by Thorn EMI with the prototype of PORTIS being introduced from 3 May 1982 in the Bristol area.

They replaced the Almex machines with Omniprinter that were used previously for on-board train ticket sales.

The PORTIS was the first British Railways ticket issuing system to use thermal roll ticket stock.

The production version of PORTIS was introduced in 1986.

== SPORTIS ==
A modified version which accepted credit-cards was introduced slightly later, known as SPORTIS (Super Portable Ticket Issuing System).

The SPORTIS memory was configured for each route that the machine would operate, so that it held the most likely fares that would be requested. If an unusual fare was requested, then the ticket inspector would have to refer to fares manuals and enter the details manually. SPORTIS could not encode the magnetic stripe on the back of tickets, so tickets issued using the system could not be used in automated ticket gates.

SPORTIS weighed around 2.9 kg. The original specification stated that it should be about the same weight as two bags of sugar.

== Replacement ==
As of 2006 all SPORTIS have been replaced by Avantix Mobile or Paper Ticket Pads, RSP 4407/4408 series for those Train Operating Companies, for example, Merseyrail, who did not adopt Avantix Mobile as a replacement.
