= Ticketclever =

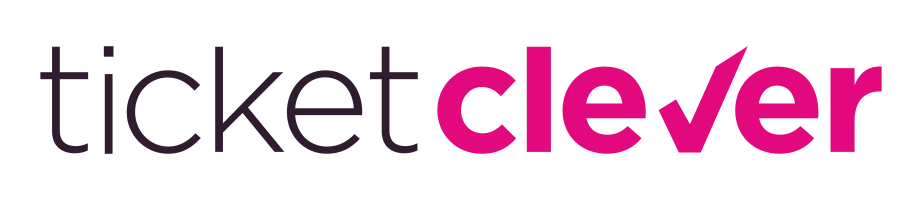
- Industry: Travel
- Founded: 2016
- Defunct: 2018
- Headquarters: Oxford, England
- Number of locations: 3 (Oxford, London, Cape Town)
- Area served: United Kingdom
- Key people: Jeremy Acklam (CEO)
- Services: Train tickets
- Owner: Global Travel Ventures
- Website: www.ticketclever.com

Ticketclever (styled as ticketclever) was an online retailer of train tickets for services in the United Kingdom, which traded from 2017 to 2019. Ticketclever was known for creating an algorithm that was used to assess numerous split ticketing combinations and package them together for a given journey.

Ticketclever was based in Oxford, with offices in London and Cape Town, South Africa.

== History ==
Global Travel Ventures Ltd (GTV) developed TicketClever (initially called FareMaster) in 2014. Ticketclever was launched in January 2017. Jeremy Acklam, previously from Trainline, was the co-founder and CEO. In March 2017, ticketclever announced they were partnering with the charity St John Ambulance to donate an amount to the charity on purchase of a train ticket. GTV sold a 20% stake in the company to train operating company Stagecoach Group in June 2017.

GTV entered administration in December 2018 and Ticketclever Ltd was dissolved in September 2019.

== Algorithm ==
Ticketclever used analytics and data science to find the lowest price for a given journey. The company employed three Oxford University alumni to create an algorithm that processed datasets from the Rail Delivery Group, which represented 25 train operating companies in Great Britain that were responsible for running trains and setting the price of the fares. Ticketclever used this algorithm to find multi-ticket fare deals.

== Refunds ==
Ticketclever was able to issue refunds in accordance with the National Rail Conditions of Travel, if the circumstances allowed for a refund. The eligibility to change or cancel tickets varied depending on the type of ticket purchased. Companies could choose to charge an administration fee of up to £10 according to the National Rail Conditions of Carriage for refunds.
