= British Rail Telecommunications =

Private telecoms network

British Rail Telecommunications was created in 1992 by British Rail (BR). It was the largest private telecoms network in Britain, consisting of 17,000 route kilometres of fibre optic and copper cable which connected every major city and town in the country and provided links to continental Europe through the Channel Tunnel.

Britain's railways have made use of telecommunications in their operations since the late 1830s, having commissioned the first commercial electric telegraph line in the world. Furthermore, several of the first switched voice networks were installed by British railway companies. Under BR, the use and capability of telecommunications expanded greatly; early moves included the adoption of teleprinters, leading to the creation of the National Teleprinter Network (NTN) in the late 1970s. In the late 1960s and early 1970s, under the National Telecoms Plan (NTP), a nationwide co-axial cable based 4 MHz system was installed, which provided transmission bearer services for both voice and real-time data networks. This network was an essential component for the increasing use of real-time centralised control and information systems, such as the TOPS computer system used by BR for managing railway locomotives and rolling stock across its network. BR also operated its own national trunked radio network, providing dedicated train-to-shore mobile communications; this was eventually replaced by the GSM-R radio system in the early 21st century.

In 1992, as a part of the wider reorganisation in advance of the privatisation of British Rail, BR Telecommunications Limited (BRT) was created as a separate entity. In 1995, BRT was acquired by Racal Electronics to create Racal-BRT. This entity merged with Racal Network Services (RNS) in 1997, rebranding as Racal Telecom. Following further restructuring and acquisitions, much of what had been BRT was merged into Thales Telecommunications Services (TTS) in April 2002. In the 2000s, the national railway infrastructure owner Network Rail decided to replace the transmission systems that had been sold off with a new nationwide fibre network, known as the Fixed Telecommunications Network (FTN), in conjunction with the rollout of GSM-R.

== Early history ==
In May 1837, William Fothergill Cooke (1806–1879) and Professor Charles Wheatstone (1802–1875) entered into a partnership, and on 10 June patented a five-needle telegraph for which five wires were necessary. The telegraph worked by deflecting any two of the needles at the same time to point to any one of 20 letters on the grid behind the needle. Sending and receiving messages was a slow process, as each word had to be spelt out. With only 20 letters on the grid, the spelling sometimes contained inaccuracies. On 4 July 1837, Wheatstone's and Cooke's telegraph was demonstrated to the directors of the London and Birmingham Railway between Euston and Camden Town, a distance of just under a mile; the company's engineer, Robert Stephenson, promptly approved of the provision of a permanent circuit at the railway’s expense - this was the first commercial electric telegraph line in the world.

Shortly thereafter, Stephenson introduced Cooke to Isambard Brunel, the chief engineer of the Great Western Railway. This led to the company adopting its first electric telegraph system, which ran between Paddington and West Drayton, a distance of 13 miles. It was working to Hanwell by 6 April 1839 and was completed to West Drayton on 9 April. The public could pay one shilling (5p) to view the telegraph and could send their own telegrams. The undertaking marked the first commercial use of electricity. The line was later extended to Slough, but when it was proposed to carry it to Bristol, the Directors of the railway company objected and the agreement with Cooke and Wheatstone was rejected. Eventually, it was agreed that Cooke was allowed to retain the wires in position on condition that he worked the system at his own expense and sent the railway signals free of charge. Throughout the 1840s, various other railway companies were quick to adopt Cooke & Wheatstone’s electric telegraph on this own lines, several of which also opted to carry commercial traffic as well as their own communications.

Early on, Cooke had promoted the telegraph to the railways as a safer way of working, particularly on single lines, as a medium for achieving the separation of trains (which had relied on strict timetabling). Block working, controlled by the telegraph, ensured that only one train at a time could be on a section of line. The benefits of block working were not generally appreciated until the late 1860s; on the London and North Western Railway alone, the number of block instruments increased from 311 in 1869 to 3,000 in 1879.

Britain's railways typically kept abreast of developments in the wider telecommunications sector; several of the first switched voice networks were installed by railway companies. Following nationalisation and the creation of British Rail (BR) in 1948, several of BR's regions adopted their own teleprinter networks. During the 1960s, the London Midland region installed the first non-military implementation of the Signal Transmit Receive And Distribution (STRAD) electronic teleprinter exchange at Crewe. At the time, all of the other telex networks operated by British Rail (and most systems worldwide) used Electromechanical stage-by-stage telephony-style switches, while Crewe's STRAD exchange was entirely electronic. By 1966, STRAD was reportedly reliably handling 6.5 million messages per year.

Throughout the 1960s, BR opted to extensively modernise its national telephone network under the National Telecoms Plan (NTP), which saw the deployment of a nationwide coaxial cable network along with the introduction of modems, which enabled digital data signals to be transmitted across ordinary phone lines in an analogue format with the ability to multiplex these signals. These telecommunication advances were essential to the effective deployment of TOPS, the computer system used by BR for managing railway locomotives and rolling stock across its network; the introduction of TOPS was a major component of BR's increasing use of real-time centralised control and information systems. In the late 1970s, the National Teleprinter Network (NTN) was rolled out to all regions of British Rail.

Early cabling was composed of copper and provided relatively narrow bandwidth connections (e.g. only a few kilobytes of data per second); furthermore, due to the susceptibility of copper cables to electromagnetic interference, they often required expensive immunisation protection in railway environments and have been targets for theft. As fibreoptic cables have proven to be smaller, lighter, easier to install, immune to electromagnetic interference, and can support higher data rates (e.g. multiple Gbps), there has been a concerted effort to transfer railway cabling away from copper.

== Asset types ==
The fixed bearer network forms the core of railway communications and thus is vital to the operation of the railway. It provides essential circuits for signalling and electrification control systems, train radio systems, lineside communications, level crossing CCTV, and customer information systems as well as more general IT and business telephony needs.

The fixed bearer network infrastructure comprises transmission systems and telephone exchanges, linked by a fibre optic and copper cable network that is located mainly within trackside troughing routes.

British Rail had several analogue radio networks that supported mobile communication applications for drivers and lineside workers. These radio networks consist of base stations, antenna systems and control equipment. The National Radio Network (NRN) was developed specifically for the operational railway; it provides radio coverage for 98% of the rail network through 500 base stations and 21 radio exchanges.

The NRN offers full access to the BRT telephone network; public service telephone network (PSTN) dialling, including international, is also available. It can provide dedicated open channels on talk-through mode for incident management and an override priority facility to ensure that emergency calls are immediately connected to the railway's Train Control Offices (TCO) and Electrical Control Rooms (ECR). The NRN and ORN are based on analogue radio technology and provide a high level of coverage throughout the railway network for mobile communication at the trackside. The ORN offers facilities for driver emergency communication with the local train control office. The Radio Electronic Token Block (RETB) system is based on similar technology as the NRN and ORN but provides data communication for signalling token block exchange as well as voice communication.

Secure communication between drivers and signallers is provided by the Cab Secure Radio (CSR) systems located in various parts of the country. This application of analogue radio technology is designed to offer complete radio coverage at the trackside within the limits of its deployment. Fixed communication at the trackside is provided by lineside communication systems. These systems are primarily provided for signallers' communication with drivers and the public, through telephones located on signal posts and at level crossings.

Signal Post Telephones (SPTs) and other lineside phones are linked to telephone concentrators at the signal box.

Special self-monitoring systems (PETS) are also provided for high-risk level crossings.

CCTV systems are provided on platforms where driver-only operation train services call and at some stations with sub-surface platforms. These self-contained systems comprise cameras, monitors, cabling and control equipment.

Voice recorders are also classed as telecoms assets.

== Privatisation and reorganisation ==
The fixed network as we know it today was installed piecemeal as part of BR's electrification and signalling projects between 1972 and 1993. Fault reporting is localised and system failure is generally only uncovered as a consequence of customer complaint. The fixed telecommunications network consists of a wide variety of mostly old technologies, some of which are obsolete.

The network provided two service areas to BR, operational (which was of particular importance in communications for railway signalling, amongst other internal activities) and business services. During the early 1980s, BR helped establish core infrastructure for Mercury Communications (now Vodafone) by laying a resilient figure-of-eight fibre optic network alongside Britain's railway lines, spanning London, Bristol, Birmingham, Leeds and Manchester. Commercial ambitions were hampered by the necessity for effective charging mechanisms that were needed to provide such services; these were crude as metering had not been a previously established requirement.

In 1992, amid the wider moves towards the privatisation of British Rail, BR Telecommunications Limited (BRT) was established. Politicians sought to realise the commercial potential of BR's telecoms assets, to exploit its wayleave rights and to take responsibility for the management and maintenance of the industry's voice, data and radio networks associated with the operational running of the railway and its business needs. It was anticipated that the network, which had some identified spare capacity at that time, could be exploited for external telecommunications customers. A new management team was set up for BRT in 1994, alongside appropriate commercial arrangements between BRT and Railtrack prior to privatisation, the latter being a key safety-critical customer for BRT as the primary inheritor of British Rail's rail infrastructure.

== After British Rail ==
In 1994, it was announced that BRT would be acquired by Racal Electronics, thereafter becoming Racal-BRT. This sale comprised primarily the voice, transmission and data networks formerly owned by BR, however, it did not include the operational telecoms systems that were associated with the direct operation of trains (e.g. those used for signal box communications) as these remained with Railtrack instead. The sale has been critiqued as Racal allegedly did not properly understand the responsibilities that it took on through this acquisition.

In 1997, Racal-BRT merged with Racal Network Services (RNS) to become Racal Telecom. Three years later, the business was split up and sold again; the trunk cable, transmission and voice networks were acquired by the American telecoms company Global Crossing while the remainder, which included most of the ex-BRT staff, was transferred to the French conglomerate Thomson CSF. The latter was reorganised into two separate companies, Thales Translink and Thales Fieldforce, which were subsequently merged into Thales Telecommunications Services (TTS) in April 2002.

In the 2000s, Network Rail (the publicly-owned replacement for Railtrack) decided to replace the sold-off transmission systems with a new nationwide fibre network, known as the Fixed Telecommunications Network (FTN) at an initial cost of £1.5 billion. The FTN was designed to be the carrier network a range of safety-related application, including the control of remote signalling interlockings and the Supervisory Control and Data Acquisition (SCADA) for railway electrification systems, via GSM-R - the replacement for the BR-era National Radio Network (NRN). As a part of this initiative, on 1 April 2009, under TUPE employment regulations, around 480 telecoms experts moved from Thales to a newly-created company, Network Rail Telecoms (NRT), which is a subsidiary of Network Rail.

NRT has not been granted a monopoly on railway telecommunications. By 2012, the general-purpose railway telephone network, ETD (Extension Trunk Dialling), including the important 999 emergency and 17x electrification control access services, was still being operated by the American telecoms firm Level 3 Communications (which had acquired Global Crossing). NRT has also investigated several commercial prospects for the FTN, which is routed through many of the UK's more remote areas, including the opportunity to provide broadband services under a joint initiative with the government-led Broadband UK scheme. In early 2013, the FTN completed its nationwide rollout, at which point it comprised 823 nodes. By 2015, Network Rail's fibre and copper cable backbones constituted 16,000km and 22,000km respectively and carried in excess of 200,000 circuits.

== GSM-R ==
GSM-R radio systems are being introduced across Europe under EU legislation for interoperability. In the UK, Network Rail has established a stakeholder's board with cross industry representation to drive the UK implementation of GSM-R to replace the National Radio Network (NRN) and Cab Secure Radio (CSR) systems currently in use.

The Rail Safety and Standards Board are revising the current train-to-shore radio standard GO/RT3410, renumbering it as GE/RT8080, and developing a new standard GE/RT8081 that contains requirements that are specific to GSM-R. The Railway Group Standards are being developed to support the European Functional Requirements Specification and should be read in conjunction with this document.

The Network Rail National Project for the introduction of GSM-R plans for the radio service to be live nationwide by 2007, with the current radio systems switched off at the end of 2009. Britain's GSM-R network should be fully operational by 2013 at a cost of £1.2 billion. This cost though does not include the West Coast Main Line, where transmission equipment supplied by Marconi is maintained by Telent.

GSM-R addresses the relevant recommendations from several accident inquiries:

- Clapham (1988)
- Abbeyhill (1994)
- Cowden (1994)
- Ais Gill (1995)
- Doncaster (1995)
- Winsford (1999)
- Ladbroke Grove (1999)
- Llanbrynmair (2000)
- Tregoss Moor (2000)
- Hatfield (2001)

GSM-R is the bearer for the European Rail Traffic Management System (ERTMS) signalling being introduced from 2010.

== Locomotives ==
At the time of its privatisation, British Rail Telecommunications operated four British Rail Class 20 locomotives: 20075, 20128, 20131 and 20187.
