= London station group =

Station group

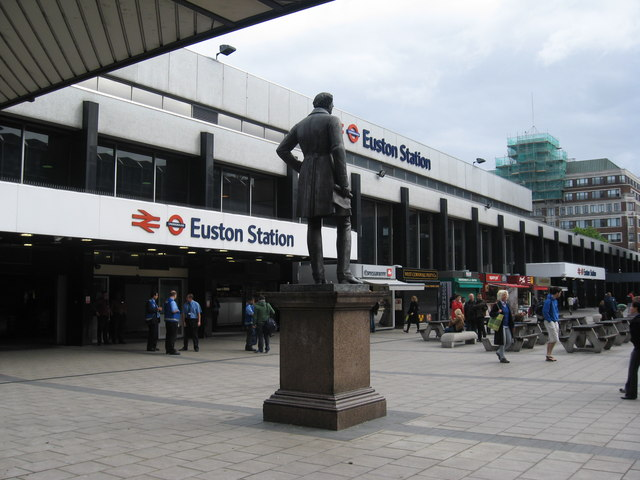
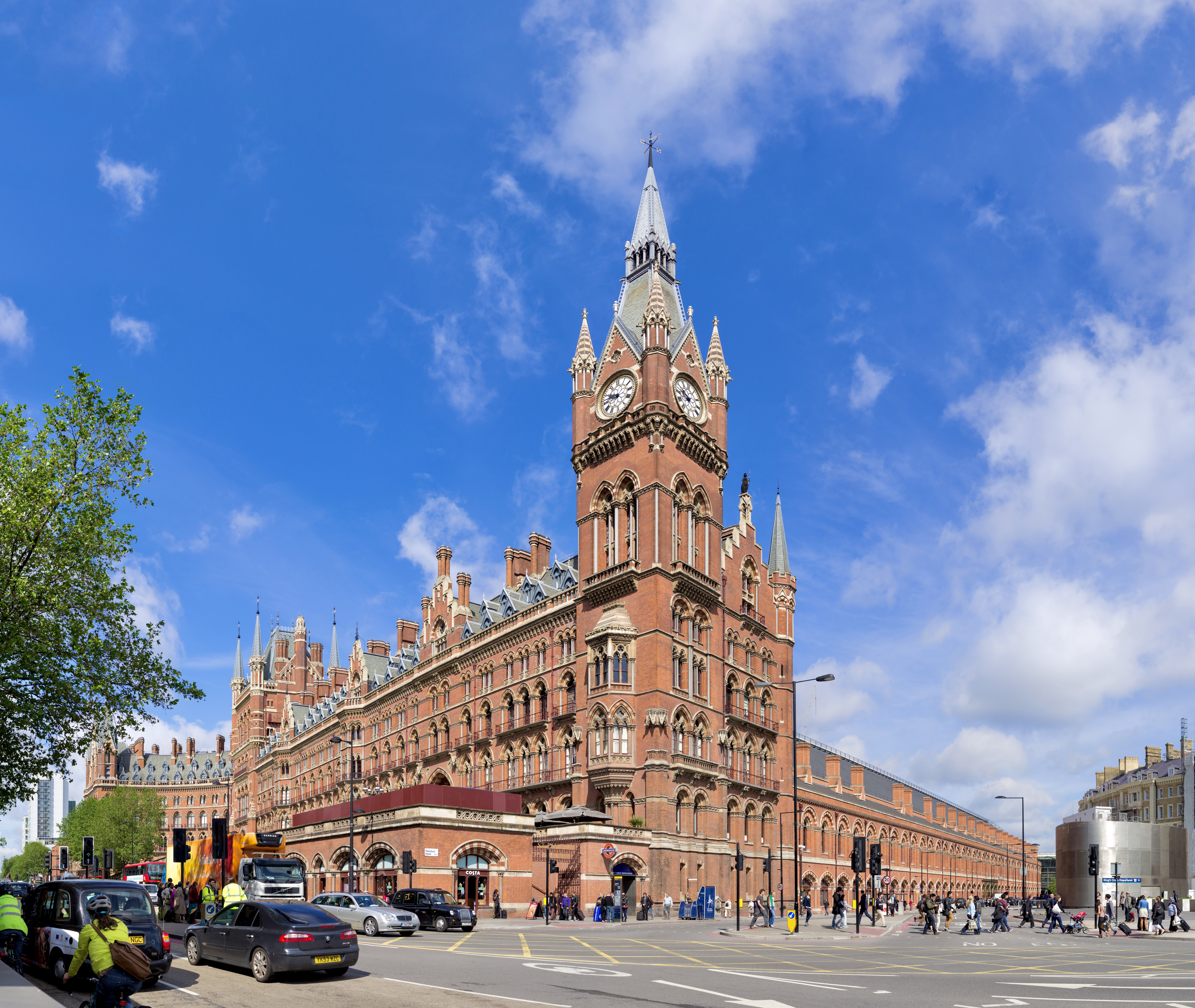
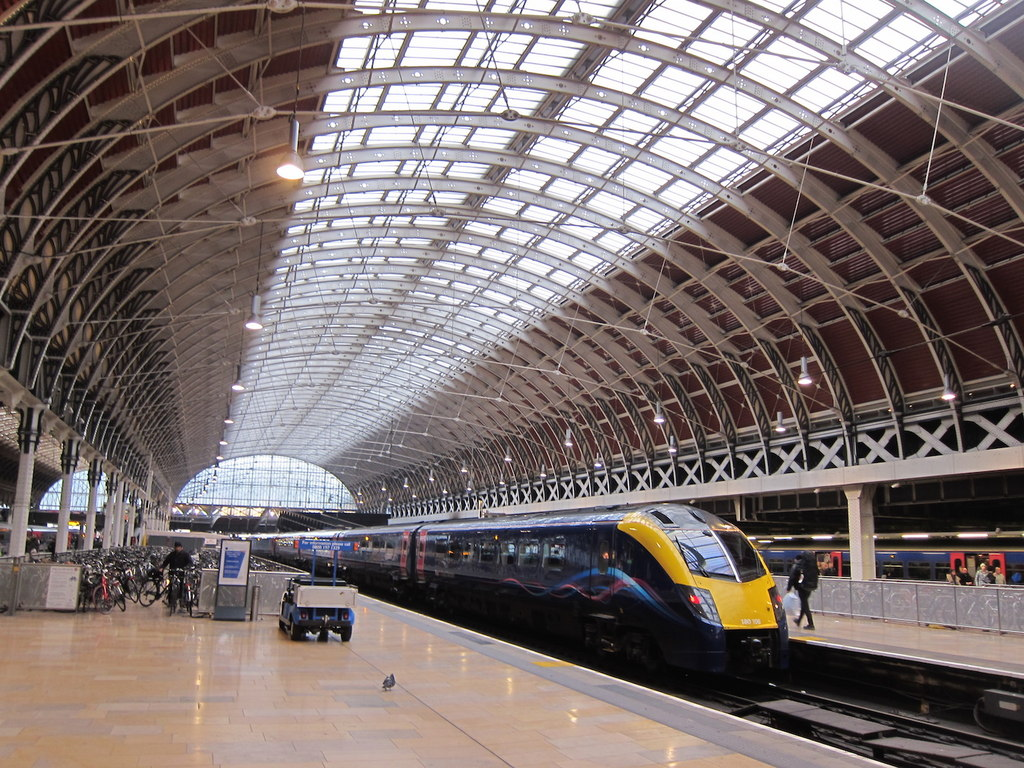
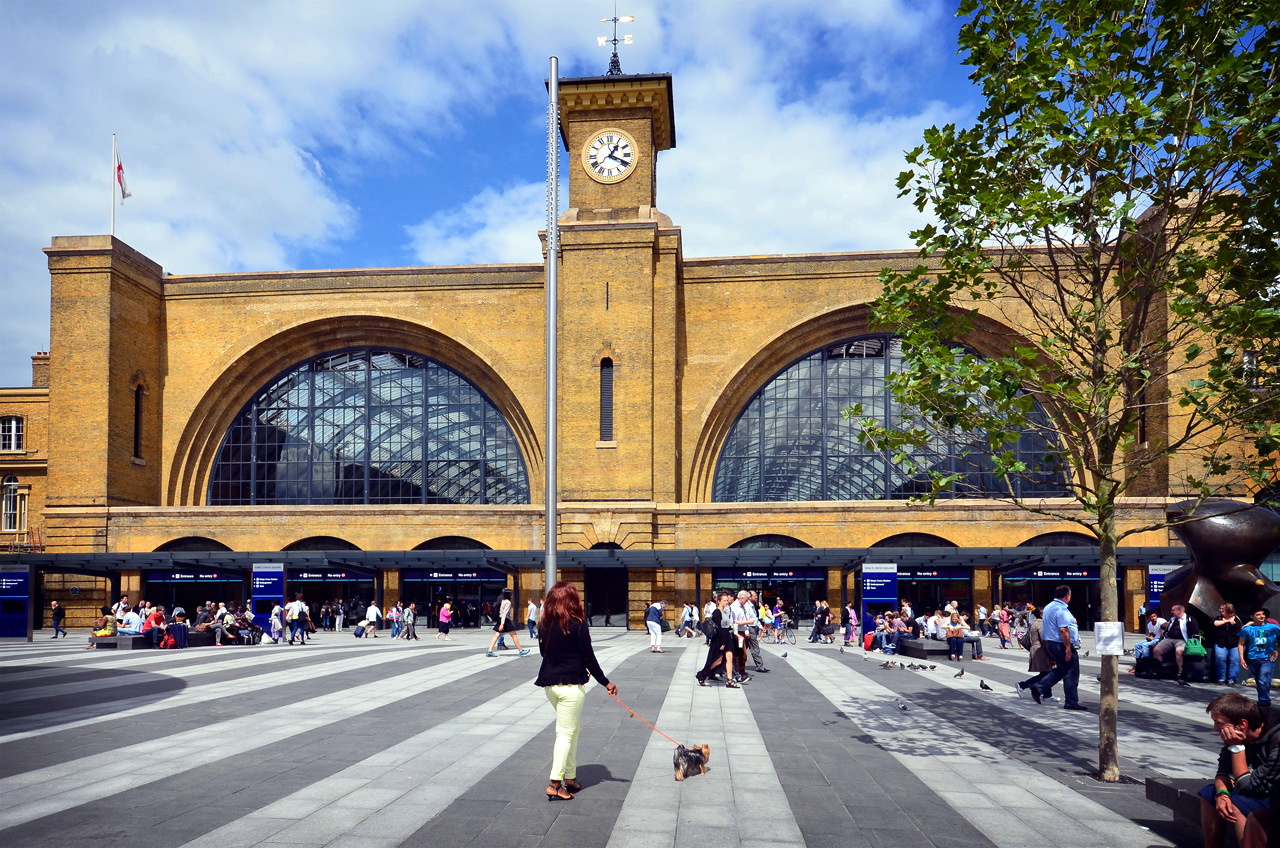
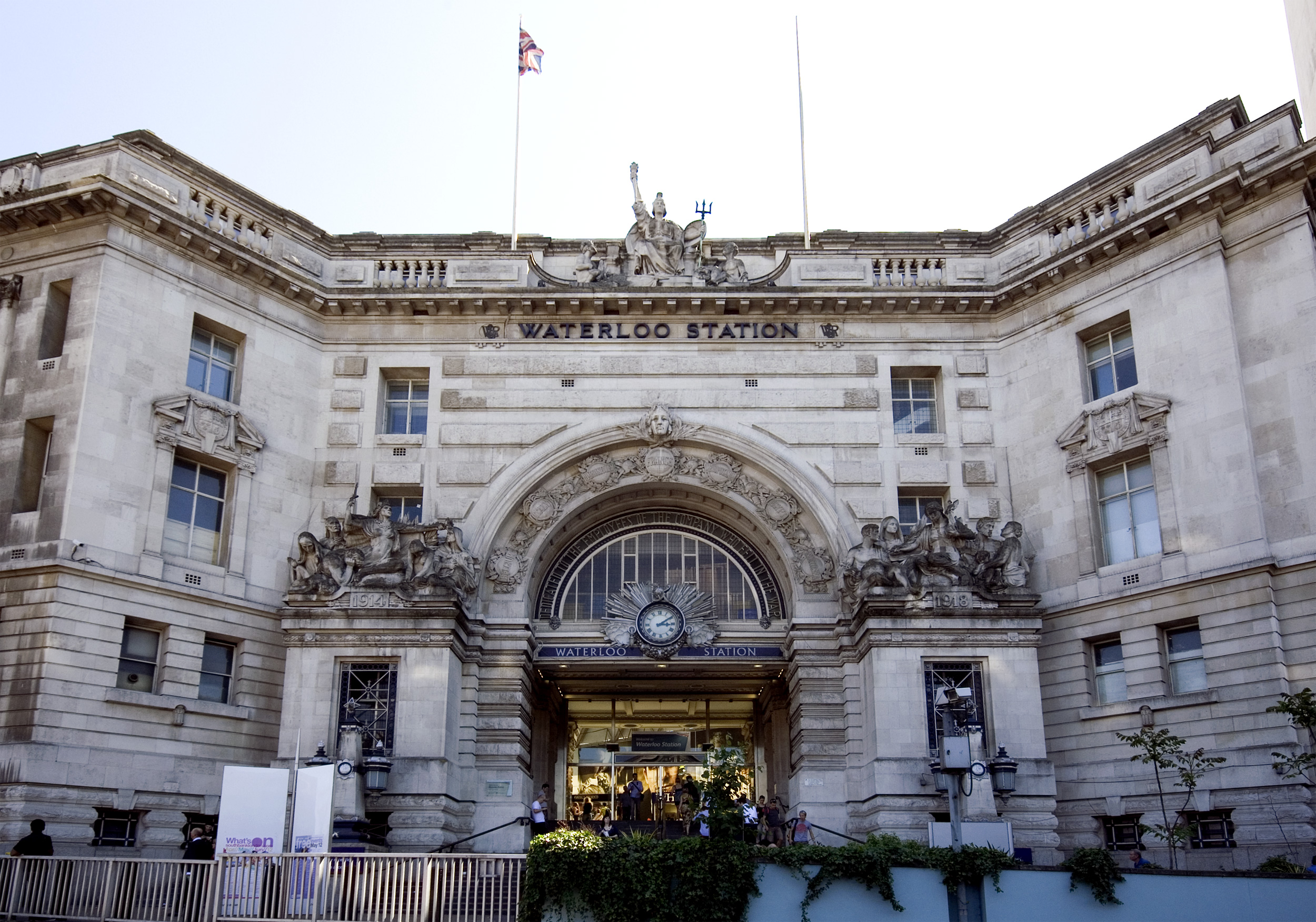
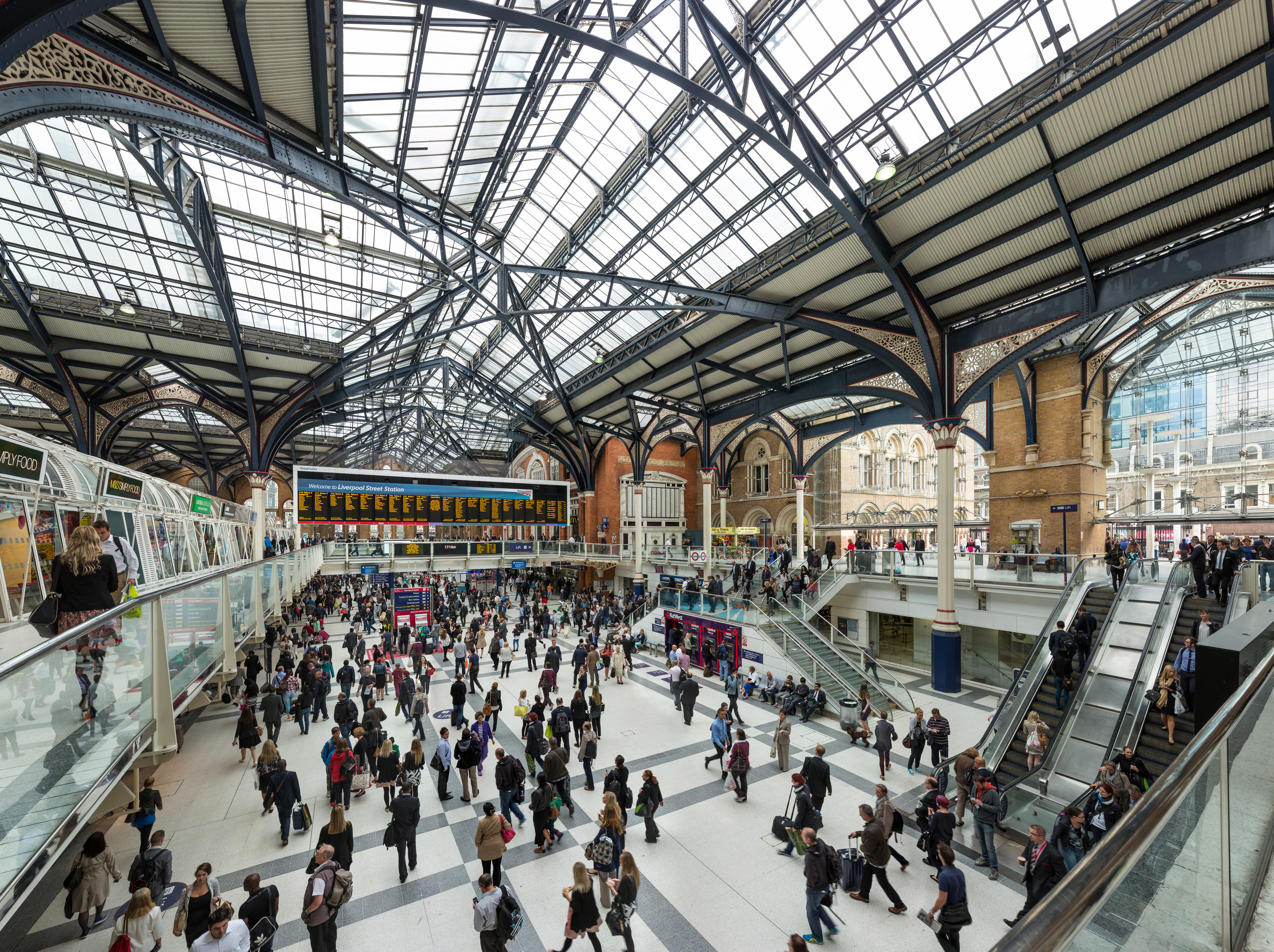
Six terminal stations in London. Clockwise from top left: Euston, St Pancras, King's Cross, Liverpool Street, Waterloo and Paddington.

The London station group is a group of 18 railway stations served by the National Rail network in central London, England. The group contains all 14 terminal stations in central London, either serving major national services or local commuter routes, and four other through-stations that are considered terminals for ticketing purposes. All current stations in the group fall within London fare zone 1. A ticket marked "London Terminals" allows travel to any station in the group via any permitted route, as determined by the National Routeing Guide.

Most London terminal stations were developed in the mid-19th century during the initial boom of rail transport. Many stations were built around the edge of central London, stopping at what is now the London Inner Ring Road, because it was prohibitively expensive to build right into the centre, and because each railway was owned by a private company competing with the others. The creation of the London Underground provided a practical connection to the various terminals, which continues to be the case as of the 21st century. Many of the stations have been upgraded and modernised to provide a greater capacity and connections to the network; the first London terminal, London Bridge has been rebuilt and expanded on numerous occasions, and of the major 19th century terminals, only Broad Street and Holborn Viaduct have closed. Broad Street was closed and became Broadgate with the route being repurposed as part of London Overground through Dalston Junction. Holborn Viaduct was replaced by City Thameslink at the same location.

The London terminals had a significant impact on the local area. Originally, the demolition of poor properties, particularly south of the River Thames, caused blight and deprived areas around the station. This has changed in the 21st century, where development around the main terminals has been well-received and attracted occupants and businesses.

== Definition ==
Map showing the thirteen major railway stations and termini of central London

Until 1970, railway tickets to London were issued to a specific named terminal. From April of that year, Southern Region terminals were grouped together as a "notional common station" called "LONDON S.R."; tickets issued to this destination were valid to Blackfriars, Cannon Street, Charing Cross, Holborn Viaduct, London Bridge, Vauxhall, Victoria, Waterloo and Waterloo East. The concept was extended to the rest of London's terminals with effect from British Rail's fares update of May 1983, when the London station group was created: "as part of the progress towards simplification of routes and a reduction of [separate fares] ... a common origin/destination of LONDON BR has been adopted for most London fares". Tickets to the London station group were issued to "LONDON BR" until January 1989, when the name "LONDON BRIT RAIL" was adopted. After the privatisation of British Rail, the name "LONDON" on its own was used from the end of 1997 until April 1998, when the present designation "LONDON TERMINALS" was introduced.

All stations in the London group are in London fare zone 1 and most are at the end of a railway line. This includes major national terminals such as Waterloo, Paddington, Euston and King's Cross, and local commuter terminals such as Cannon Street and Moorgate. In addition, the group includes four stations (City Thameslink, Old Street, Vauxhall and Waterloo East) that are not technically terminals but are used enough as a destination by National Rail to be considered appropriate as a "London Terminal" for ticketing purposes. (Note: Although Farringdon is permitted as a stop on a ticket for a journey on any Thameslink service, it is not valid on any "London Terminals" ticket unlike the neighbouring stations on that route.) The composition of the group has changed several times since 1983, when 18 stations were included: Blackfriars, Broad Street, Cannon Street, Charing Cross, Euston, Fenchurch Street, Holborn Viaduct, Kings Cross, Kings Cross Midland City, Liverpool Street, London Bridge, Marylebone, Moorgate, Paddington, St Pancras, Vauxhall, Victoria and Waterloo. Waterloo East was included separately from January 1984. Two years later, Moorgate was dropped from the group in favour of Old Street, and Kensington Olympia was included; this was in connection with its upgrade in early 1986 to an InterCity station with regular British Rail services from northwest England to the south coast. Moorgate was reinstated as a member of the group in May 1988, and Kensington Olympia was removed from the list in May 1994 as British Rail decided to make fares to and from the station identical to those of neighbouring station Willesden Junction.

Tickets issued to "LONDON TERMINALS" can be used to travel from the station of origin to any London terminal that can be reached via a permitted route as defined by the National Routeing Guide. For example, a journey from Brighton can use such a ticket to take a train to several different London terminals, including London Bridge, London Charing Cross, London Cannon Street, Victoria, Blackfriars, City Thameslink or Waterloo via Clapham Junction. The ticket cannot be used to travel to any station using any non-National Rail modes of transport, including the London Underground, Docklands Light Railway or London Buses. Therefore, a journey from Brighton cannot use a "London Terminals" ticket to travel to Euston or Paddington, as there is no permitted route to them using National Rail services alone. The concept of permitted routes did not exist until the National Routeing Guide was introduced in 1996: British Rail used the term "reasonable route", and in respect of the London station group merely stated that journeys between the origin station and London were "subject to normal route availabilities".

== Background ==
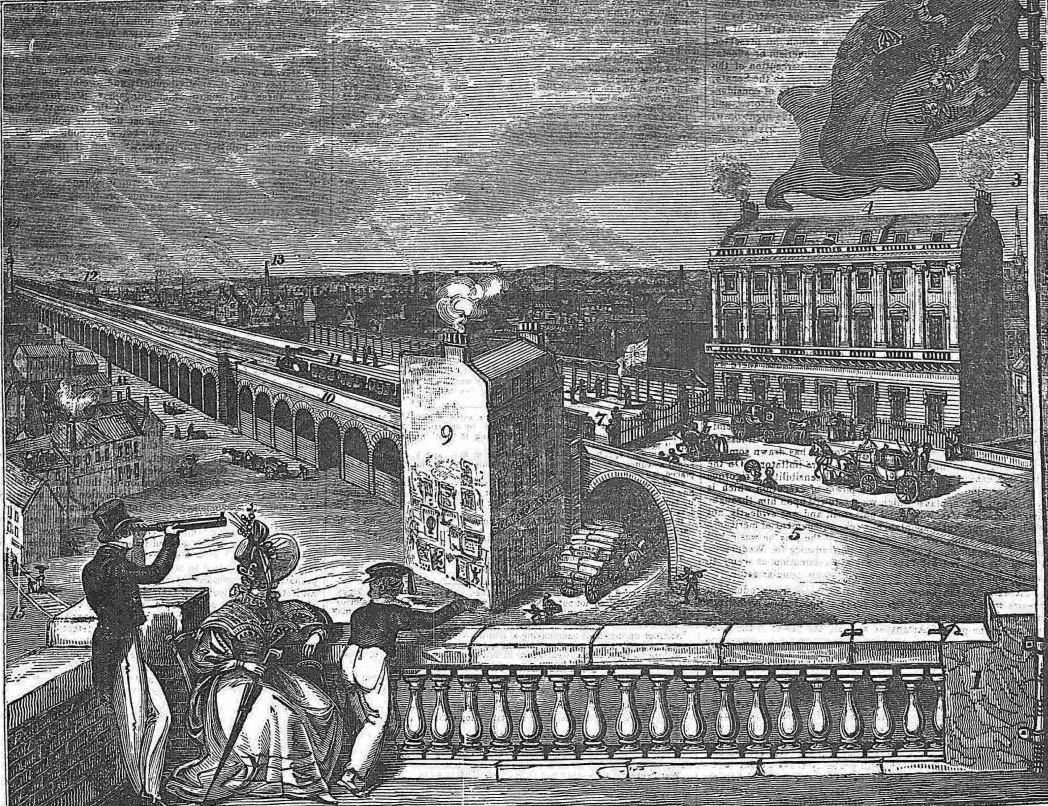
The first London terminal station, London Bridge, in 1836

The first London terminal stations were built in the late 1830s (starting with London Bridge in 1836) and the early to mid 1840s. Those north of the Thames came up to the edge of richly-developed property that was too expensive to demolish, while property south of the river contained slums and cheap property, making it easier to have terminal stations close to the City and West End, both the main desired areas. The solicitor and railway planner Charles Pearson proposed a main central station at Farringdon, which would connect out to all branch lines. In 1846, the Royal Commission on Metropolitan Railway Termini was established to see if it was appropriate to bring the terminal stations any further and possibly connect with each other, as per Pearson's plans. The report concluded this was unnecessary, a single terminal was undesirable as it would create too much congestion and it was too expensive to demolish remaining property in the way.

The Royal Commission recommended that no new stations should be built in the West End of London or the city, and that the New Road should be the northern boundary of railway development. This created competition between the individual railway companies, who could promote new terminals with individual financial backers. Exemptions were made for the Great Eastern Railway and North London Railway with Liverpool Street and Broad Street respectively. The only main railway line built across Central London was the London, Chatham and Dover Railway (LCDR) line connecting Blackfriars to Farringdon via Snow Hill Tunnel in 1866.

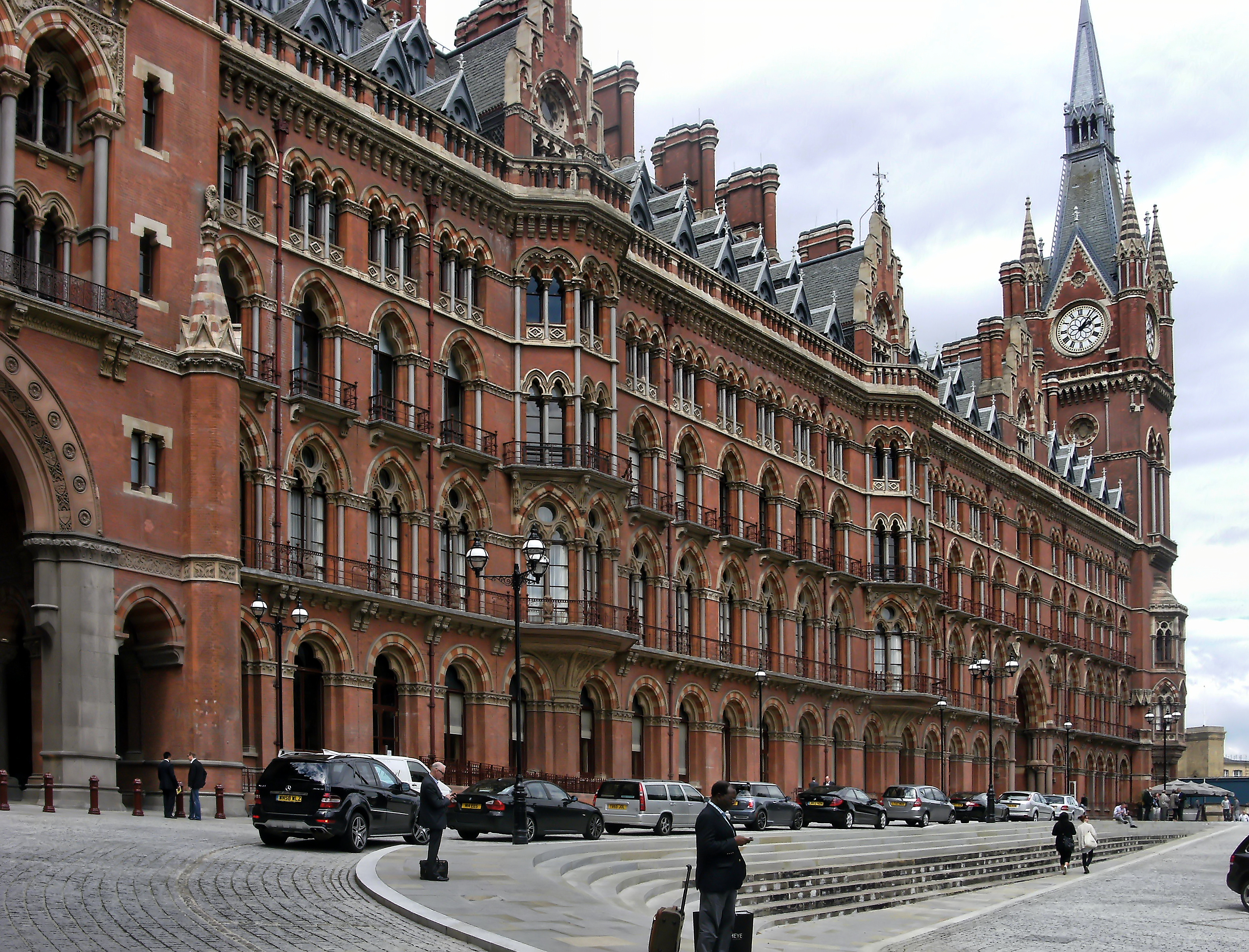
The distinctive Gothic architecture of St Pancras railway station survived demolition, unlike neighbouring Euston.

Railway construction in London reached a peak between the mid-1850s and 1870s, where an estimated £40 million (£3,911 million as of 2025) was spent constructing routes around the capital. The competition between terminals led to increased costs and financial overruns. Around £2 million (£196 million as of 2025) was spent constructing the final approach of the GER main line from the original terminal at Bishopsgate to Liverpool Street, while the extension from London Bridge to Cannon Street and Charing Cross cost £4 million (£391 million as of 2025). The construction of the LCDR's line via Blackfriars and Farringdon almost bankrupted the company and left it in financial ruin for the rest of its existence. The 1864 Joint Committee on Railway Schemes (Metropolis) decided that, following the success of the underground Metropolitan Railway, that a circular railway should be built to connect the terminals, which eventually became the Circle line, though it was not completed until 1884.

By 1870, the boom in building London terminals had finished. The final one to open was the Great Central Railway's Marylebone, in 1899. By this time, around 776 acres (1.21 square miles; 3.14 square kilometres), or 5.4% of land in the central zone of London was owned by railway companies, more than the Corporation of London.

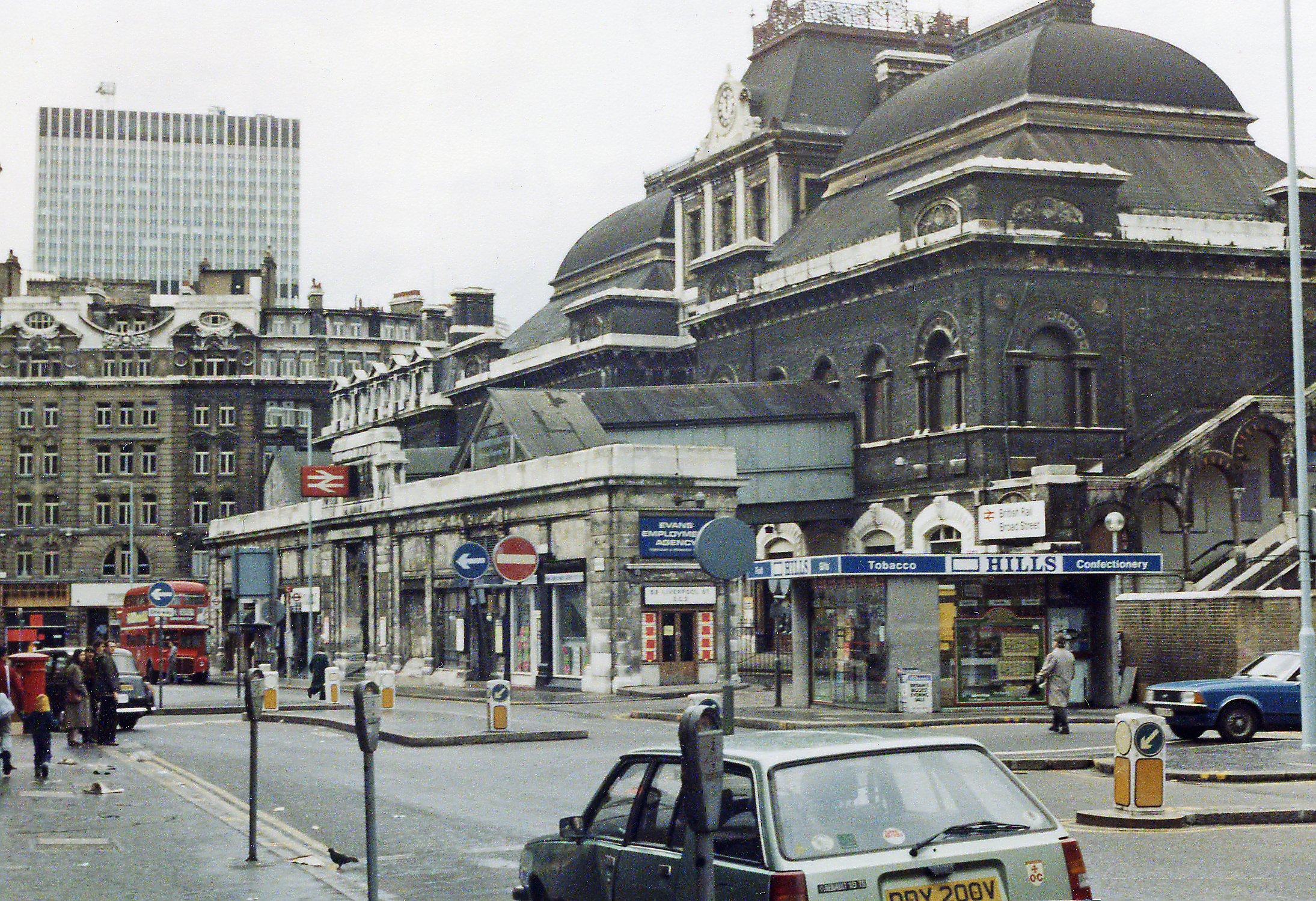
Broad Street station was one of the few in the London station group to be closed and demolished.

The problem of connecting the various London terminals was ultimately resolved by the development of the Underground. The Metropolitan Railway, which opened in 1863, was designed to connect Paddington with King's Cross. The Circle Line was designed specifically to connect the London terminals together. All terminal stations had at least one underground connection by 1913, except Fenchurch Street, Ludgate Hill and Holborn Viaduct. As an alternative to the tube, buses have connected the various terminals. In 1928, the Southern Railway, London and North Eastern Railway and Great Western Railway began to provide dedicated buses between their terminals for Pullman and Continental trains. These were taken over by the London Passenger Transport Board (LPTB) upon its formation in 1933, and replaced with regular bus services. From 1936, the LPTB supplied purpose-build 20-seater coaches for this services, with large luggage boots and a flat fare of 1/- (£3.06 as of 2025). These were suspended during World War II. All stations except Fenchurch Street and Blackfriars provided integrated taxi services on opening. These originally had dedicated access roads to the station platforms when cabs were horse-drawn, while later purpose-built roads were built for road traffic.

In the early 20th century, stations were expanded and upgraded to fit demand. Six terminal stations (Victoria, Waterloo, Euston, Cannon Street, Blackfriars and London Bridge) have been completely rebuilt and London Bridge has seen multiple rebuilds. Although the modern concept of listed buildings had been introduced with the 1947 Town and Country Planning Act 1947, stations were not high priority to be listed. While some had impressive facades and entrances, Victorian stations were not looked upon favourably in the 1960s and had become gradually neglected. One of the most significant examples was the demolition of the Euston Arch in 1962 as part of modernisation works to the station, while the area around Kings Cross became run-down. An important exception was the Victorian Gothic structure of St Pancras, which became a Grade I listed building in 1967 after being threatened with demolition. Similarly, King's Cross and Paddington became Grade I listed in 1954 and 1961 respectively.

In 1986, Broad Street, which had been a major London terminal for local and commuter services, closed. It was feared that Marylebone and St Pancras would follow, but both have been revitalised; the former became an alternative terminal for services to Oxford and Birmingham while the latter is now the main entry point for Eurostar services via the Channel Tunnel.

== Cultural impact ==
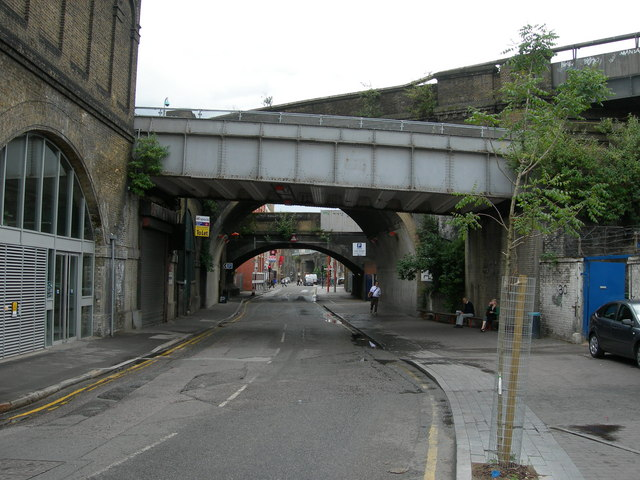
The building of railway lines into London took up a substantial amount of land, particularly south of the Thames.

The various terminal stations began to affect their surrounding area once built. Those displaced by the railways crammed into whatever existing accommodation was available, creating slums, and the immediate area around the stations were filled with cheap souvenir shops and prostitutes. Conversely, the middle class moved out into suburbs which now had easy access to Central London via train, and railway traffic increased. Around 76,000 people lost their homes between 1853 and 1901 as a direct result of rail expansion. The area around Waterloo had already become notorious for prostitution by the time the station was built, which was eventually cleared away in 1867 when the London and South Western Railway made a compulsory purchase order for the properties and demolished them, to accommodate an expanded station. A significant exception was the later-constructed Marylebone, while Charing Cross was less affected by slum building than neighbouring stations.

Around Battersea and New Cross, railway lines and interchanges occupied about 300 acres (120 ha) of available space. The low-income property that was destroyed by building the stations was generally not replaced, and consequently the remaining accommodation became overcrowded. The proliferation of railway lines south of the Thames is why the Underground has more lines north of the river, as it did not have alternative overground services.

In contrast to the 19th century impact of stations, newer developments have seen gentrification of the areas around them. Both Kings Cross and St Pancras stations have been modernised in the 21st century, and are now better regarded. Many goods sheds have been removed, and the area surrounding the stations includes a natural swimming pool, and numerous new apartments.

The four former London and North Eastern Railway terminals (King's Cross, Marylebone, Fenchurch Street and Liverpool Street) are the stations on a standard British Monopoly board.

== Group members ==
=== Current stations ===
Station	Image	Location	Coordinates	Original owner	Managed by	London services	National services	Annual entry/exit (millions) (as of 2023/24) (Note: The figure shows a green "up" arrow for an increase from the previous year, and a red "down" arrow for a decrease.)	Opening date	Platforms (Note: Not including London Underground)		Category (Note: The category is set by the Department for Transport and runs in decreasing order of importance from A (national hub) to F (unstaffed).)
Station	Image	Location	Coordinates	Original owner	Managed by	London services	National services	Annual entry/exit (millions) (as of 2023/24)	Opening date	Terminal	Through	Category
Blackfriars		City of London	51.511°N 0.103°W	London, Chatham and Dover Railway	Thameslink	NW, N, S, SE	Thameslink, Gatwick Airport, Luton Airport	15.193 ▲	10 May 1886	2	2	A
Cannon Street		City of London	51.510°N 0.090°W	South Eastern Railway	Network Rail	SE	Kent, East Sussex	7.508 ▲	1 September 1866	7	0	A
Charing Cross		Westminster	51.507°N 0.123°W	South Eastern Railway	Network Rail	SE	Kent, East Sussex	19.768 ▲	11 January 1864	6	0	A
City Thameslink		City of London	51.516°N 0.103°W	British Rail (Network SouthEast)	Thameslink	NW, N, S, SE	Thameslink, Gatwick Airport, Luton Airport	7.636 ▲	30 May 1990	0	2	D
Euston		Camden	51.528°N 0.133°W	London and Birmingham Railway	Network Rail	NW	West Coast Main Line	40.249 ▲	20 July 1837	18	0	A
Fenchurch Street		City of London	51.511°N 0.078°W	London and Blackwall Railway	c2c	E	Southend-on-Sea	10.863 ▲	2 August 1841	4	0	A
Kings Cross		Camden	51.532°N 0.123°W	Great Northern Railway	Network Rail	N	East Coast Main Line	27.727 ▲	14 October 1852	12	0	A
Liverpool Street		City of London	51.518°N 0.081°W	Great Eastern Railway	Network Rail	E, NE	East of England, Elizabeth line, Stansted Airport,	98.016 ▲	2 February 1874	17	2 (Note: Elizabeth Line)	A
London Bridge		Southwark	51.505°N 0.086°W	London and Greenwich Railway	Network Rail	S, SE, N, NW	Kent, East Sussex, Gatwick Airport	54.686 ▲	14 December 1836	6	9	A
Marylebone		Westminster	51.522°N 0.163°W	Great Central Railway	Chiltern Railways	NW	Birmingham, Chiltern Main Line	11.773 ▲	15 March 1899	6	0	A
Moorgate		City of London	51.518°N 0.088°W	Metropolitan Railway	London Underground	N	Hertfordshire	8.791 ▲	23 December 1865	2	0	E
Old Street		Islington	51.525°N 0.087°W	City and South London Railway	London Underground	N	Hertfordshire	6.077 ▼	17 November 1901	0	2	E
Paddington		Westminster	51.517°N 0.177°W	Great Western Railway	Network Rail	W	Great Western Main Line, Elizabeth line, Heathrow Airport	69.897 ▲	16 January 1854	14	2 (Note: Elizabeth Line)	A
St Pancras		Camden	51.530°N 0.125°W	Midland Railway	Network Rail, HS1 Ltd., Eurostar International Limited	N, NW, S, SE	Midland Main Line, Thameslink, Gatwick Airport, Luton Airport, High Speed 1 (Kent), Eurostar (Belgium, France, Netherlands)	38.843 ▲	1 October 1868	13	2	A/C (Note: International and domestic category A; Thameslink category C)
Vauxhall		Lambeth	51.485°N 0.122°W	London and South Western Railway	South Western Railway	SW	Surrey	15.534 ▲	11 July 1848	0	8	B
Victoria		Westminster	51.496°N 0.144°W	Victoria Station and Pimlico Railway	Network Rail	S, SE	Kent, Sussex, Gatwick Airport, Surrey, Hampshire	53.784 ▲	10 October 1860	19	0	A
Waterloo		Lambeth	51.503°N 0.113°W	London and South Western Railway	Network Rail	SW	South West England, Surrey, Hampshire	70.390 ▲	11 July 1848	24	0	A
Waterloo East		Lambeth	51.504°N 0.110°W	South Eastern Railway	Southeastern	SE	Kent, East Sussex	6.841 ▲	1 January 1869	0	4	B

=== Former stations ===
Station	Image	Location	Coordinates	Original owner	Opening date	Ending date	Fate
Broad Street		City of London	51.519°N 0.0833°W	North London Railway	1 November 1865	30 June 1986	Closed
Holborn Viaduct		City of London	51.5162°N 0.1036°W	London, Chatham and Dover Railway	2 March 1874	26 January 1990	Closed
Kensington (Olympia)		Hammersmith and Fulham (Note: While the majority of the station is in Hammersmith and Fulham, the eastern part is in the Royal Borough of Kensington and Chelsea)	51.4986°N 0.2108°W	West London Railway	27 May 1844	1994	Still open
Kings Cross Thameslink		Camden	51.5308°N 0.1202°W	Metropolitan Railway	10 January 1863	9 December 2007	Closed

== See also ==
- List of London railway stations
- List of London Underground stations
- List of Docklands Light Railway stations
