= Split My Fare =

Online train ticket retailer

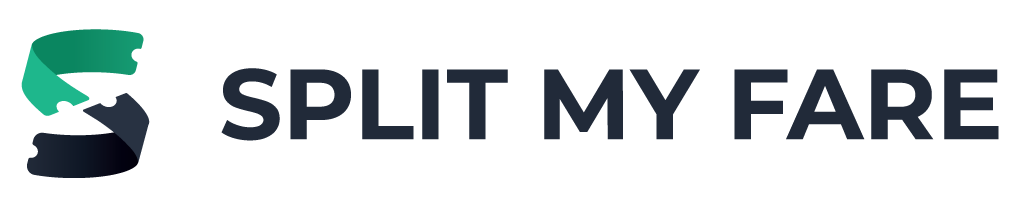
- Website type: Travel website
- Available in: English
- Founded: 2012; 14 years ago in Newcastle upon Tyne, United Kingdom
- Headquarters: Newcastle upon Tyne, United Kingdom
- Country of origin: United Kingdom
- Area served: United Kingdom
- Founders: Tobias Biberbach; Pete Walls
- Website: splitmyfare.co.uk
- Current status: Active

Split My Fare is a British online train ticket retailer that uses split ticketing to provide reduced National Rail fares for passengers travelling within the United Kingdom. It is based in Newcastle upon Tyne.

== History ==
Split My Fare was founded in 2012 by Tobias Biberbach and Pete Walls.

In December 2022, Split My Fare launched a mobile application for iOS and Android.

== Operations ==
Split My Fare operates an online ticket retail platform that automatically searches for combinations of two or more individual rail tickets for the same physical journey, where the total cost is lower than that of a single through-ticket.

Split My Fare uses a contingent fee model in which no booking or card fees are charged; instead, a fee of 15% of the saving achieved is applied only when split ticketing produces a lower fare than the equivalent single ticket. Refunds may be available directly from the operator for delays over 15 minutes through Delay Repay.
