= Pam Warren =

Pam Warren may refer to:

- Pam Warren (speaker) (born 1967), British author, activist, and founder of the Paddington Survivor's Group
- Pam Warren (civil servant), American civil servant and former Oklahoma Secretary of Administration
- Pam the Funkstress (1966–2017), American DJ
