= Sectional Appendix =

UK definition of railway infrastructure

In Great Britain, the Sectional Appendix is a railway document compiled by Network Rail and is the official definition of railway infrastructure, giving a detailed description of all railway lines owned by Network Rail. It has traditionally been published in printed format, originally as a bound book and subsequently in loose-leaf format, for ease of updating.

== History ==
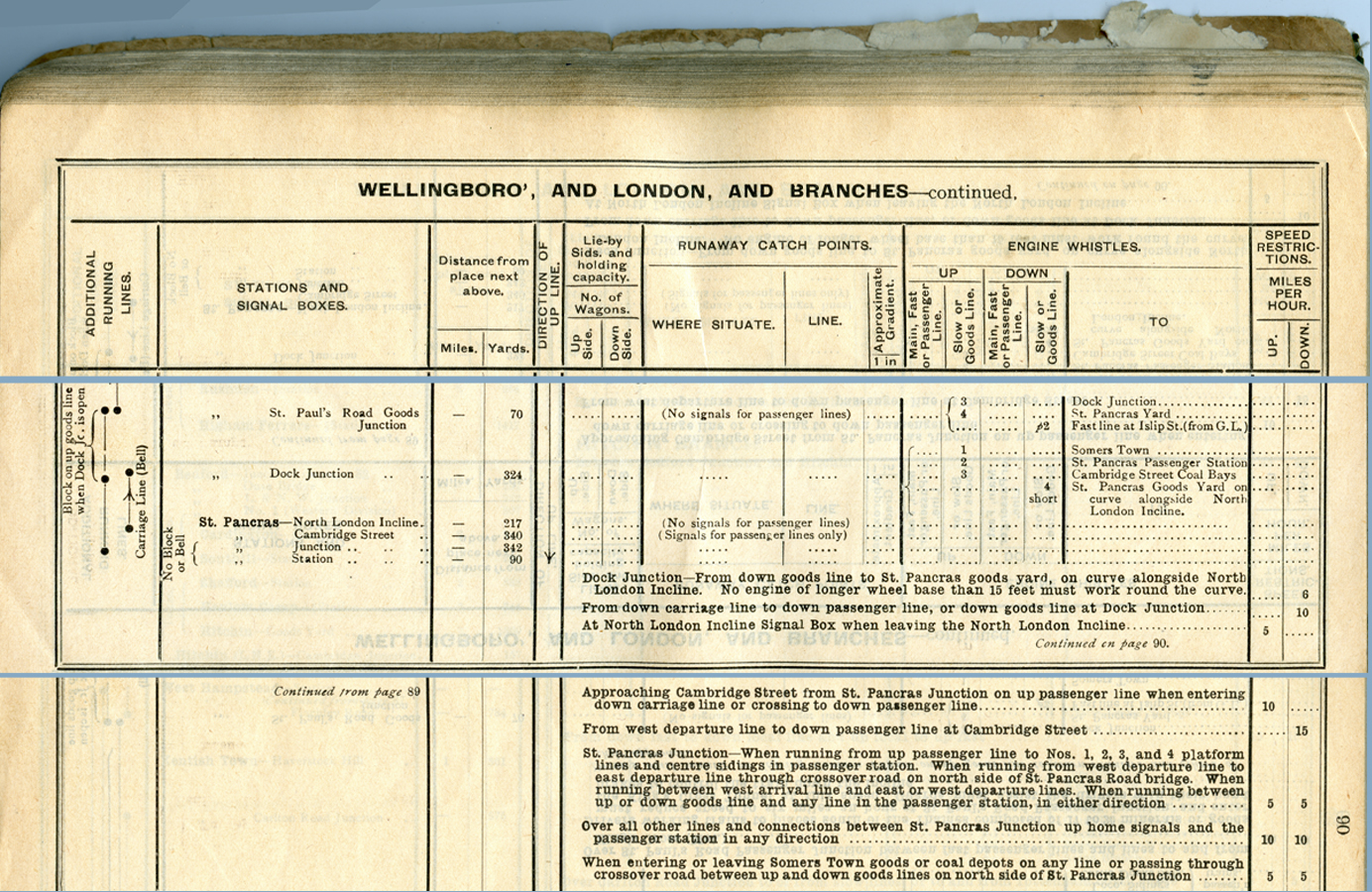
1937

In earlier years, instructions to traincrews relating to the operation of the railway were included within the working timetables. As the volume of instructions increased, they later came to be published in a separate document, known in full as the "Sectional Appendix to the Working Timetable" or similar.

== Content ==
There are modules for different areas, e.g. KSW2 covers Kent and Sussex. Each module may be divided in a similar way to the following sections:

=== Section 1: Route Module ===
Maps

Outline maps providing a general overview of the route showing lines, station names, and reference numbers. The numbers relate to pages in the detailed Table A diagrams.

Exceptionally poor rail adhesion

This is a list of known areas for exceptionally poor railhead conditions. It states the route, location, lines affected, and the mileage references between which it occurs.

Table A diagrams

This section comprises the main bulk of the module, and contains detailed maps. Information available includes;

- Name, maximum speed and direction of running lines
- Location of junctions and crossovers, and the maximum speed across them
- Name of Signal box/signalling centre controlling the lines
- NRN, Cab Secure Radio and GSM-R area coverage details
- Name and location of stations, platform identities and the maximum number or coach lengths they can accommodate
- Location and names of Tunnels, crossings and all significant infrastructure
- Location of sidings, yards, sheds, stabling and maintenance facilities
- Location of Electrical control rooms, and type of Traction current supply where applicable
- Location of Electrical substations and Track paralleling huts where applicable

All distances are given in miles and chains.

Special Working Arrangement

Special arrangement is a condition where a specific location requires there to be an operational variance to the Rulebook, or an addition to it. This section details a route, locations where the arrangement begins and ends, the type of train this applies to, the line affected, and details of the operation.

=== Section 2: Route Availability ===
This is a list of which train types are permitted to travel over each route referenced to Table A. It specifies every class of train allowed, sectionalised by type;

- Route Clearance of Diesel Multiple Unit Trains
- Route Clearance of Electric Multiple Unit Trains
- Route Clearance of Coaching Stock
- Route Clearance of Locomotives

=== Section 3: General Instructions ===
Provides general information pertaining to operations over the whole area/route.

=== Section 4: Local Instructions ===
Provides detailed information relating to specific practices at given locations.

== National Electronic Sectional Appendix ==
The "National Electronic Sectional Appendix" (NESA) is an online alternative to hard copy Sectional Appendices, although the latter are still being published and can be bought on-line, direct from Willsons Printers of Newark. Willsons also supply the various parts of the Rule Book in printed form and other items such as the AC Electrified Lines Instructions.

Periodically updated electronic versions of the Sectional Appendix are available in PDF format from the Network Rail website.
