= CIRAS =

CIRAS can mean:

- Combat Integrated Releasable Armor System, a modular protective vest designed for US Special Operations Forces
- Confidential Incident Reporting & Analysis System, a confidential safety reporting service for transport and infrastructure workers in the United Kingdom and Republic of Ireland
- Center for Industrial Research and Service (CIRAS) at Iowa State University (ISU)
