= British Rail Passenger Timetable =

Timetable containing all passenger rail services in Great Britain

- The first edition of the timetable, published in 1974
- Frequency: Annually (1974–1986); Twice-annually (since 1986)
- Format: Railway timetable
- Publisher: British Rail (1974–1997); National Rail (1997–2007); Network Rail (2006–present); The Stationery Office (2007–2014); Middleton Press (2007–2019)
- Founder: British Rail
- Founded: 1974
- First issue: 6 May 1974
- Final issue: 15 December 2019 (printed edition)
- Country: Great Britain
- Language: English
- Website: Current Full Passenger Timetable

The British Rail Passenger Timetable, later the National Rail Timetable and now the Electronic National Rail Timetable (eNRT), is a document containing the times of all passenger rail services in Great Britain. It was first published by British Rail in 1974.

== Predecessors ==
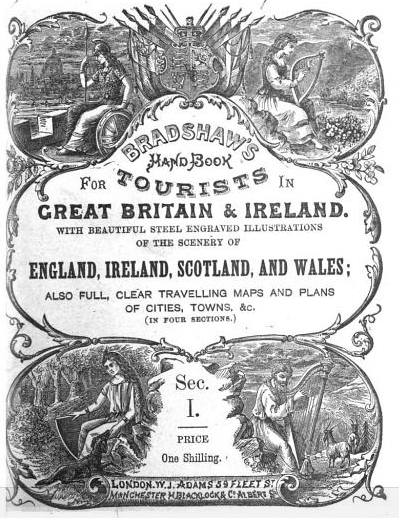
A Bradshaw's guide book and timetable

The first combined railway timetable was produced by George Bradshaw in 1839. His guide assembled timetables from the many private railway companies into one book. Bradshaw's continued to be published until 1961, with demand dwindling after the grouping of the railways in 1923, as each of the new "Big Four" companies published their own comprehensive timetable. Other companies produced their own timetables, most famously the ABC Rail Guide.

== Nationalisation ==
The British Rail logo from 1965

After the Big Four were brought into public ownership in 1948 to form British Railways (later British Rail), each of the six regions published their own timetable, containing details of all services in their region. After Bradshaw's ceased printing in 1961 (as it couldn't compete with the cheaper regional timetables), there was a gap of 13 years without a system-wide schedule.

This changed in 1974, when British Rail launched their first nationwide timetable, costing 50p (roughly £10 in 2020) and running to 1,350 pages. The British Rail Passenger Timetable continued to be published annually until 1986, at which point it was split into summer and winter issues. It was then released twice a year until the privatisation of British Rail in 1997.

== Post-privatisation ==
National Rail (owned by the Association of Train Operating Companies) was set up to provide information about passenger services after privatisation. It continued the publication of the network-wide timetable (renamed the National Rail Timetable), stopping in 2007 due to low demand.

Network Rail, who produce the scheduling data, started publishing the timetable for free on their website as the Electronic National Rail Timetable (eNRT), which is still available to download as a PDF file as of 2025. It continues to be updated twice a year, ahead of the main Europe-wide timetable changeover dates in mid-May and mid-December. The December 2020 update was cancelled "due to the COVID-19 pandemic's impact on the volume of change on the operational timetable".

The timetable continued to be published in paper format by The Stationery Office and Middleton Press. The Stationery Office published their last edition in 2014, and Middleton Press stopped production in 2019, by which point the hardcopy timetable cost £26 and was available by mail order only, meaning that there is no longer any means of obtaining a full printed timetable.

== See also ==
- History of rail transport in Great Britain
- Public transport timetable
