= British railway technical manuals =

A copy of the 2002 edition of the National Routeing Guide

The railway network of Great Britain is operated with the aid of a number of documents, which have been sometimes termed "technical manuals", because they are more detailed than the pocket-timetables which the public encounters every day. Historically, they were classified PRIVATE and not for publication, however since rail privatisation they are now more widely available, mostly in digital form, because they are produced centrally and not by the regional rail operators.

== Documents of relevance to passengers ==
=== Distributed by National Rail Enquiries ===
A copy of the 1996/1997 edition (No. 64) of the National Fares Manual (South area)

- The National Rail Conditions of Travel, which set out the customer's rights and responsibilities when travelling on the National Rail network. Every ticket purchased is a contract, and this document is the terms of that contract. It is produced by the Rail Settlement Plan, part of the Rail Delivery Group. It must be available for inspection at any ticket office selling tickets otherwise its terms may not be enforceable.
- National Fares Manual, which contains all available fares on the network, primarily of use for tracking cheaper ticket combinations. This is now published and sold by TSO (formerly The Stationery Office) as a CD-ROM, rather than as a set of printed manuals.
  - The Rail Links Manual, for combined rail and bus/ferry fares, means the volume of the National Fares Manual entitled "Rail Links Information" produced by the Rail Delivery Group three times each year.

=== Produced by the Rail Delivery Group ===
This body represents 26 train operating companies that provide passenger railway services

- The National Routeing Guide, which defines which tickets are valid on which routes.

=== Produced by Network Rail ===
Network Rail owns and operates Britain's rail infrastructure

- The National Rail timetable. This was available to the public in printed form until May 2007, and is now available from Network Rail in PDF format only.

=== Produced by The Stationery Office with permission from Network Rail ===
- GB Rail Timetable, published from December 2007 (originally as "UK Rail Timetable", although Northern Ireland was not included). New editions are normally published every Spring and Autumn.

=== Available on the UK Government website ===
- The railway by-laws, which exist under the Transport Act 2000.

== Documents which relate solely to the operation of the network ==
=== Produced by Network Rail ===
- Train Planning Rules. Used by those who plan the logistics of operating the network
- Network Rail standards. Documents that specify requirements directed towards securing the safe and efficient operation of the rail infrastructure. Track standards were supported by the 'Business Critical Rules Programme' pilot in June 2012.
- The Sectional Appendix is the definitive source of information on UK railway infrastructure for specific regions.
- The Weekly Operating Notice (WON) provides information of Safety Notices, Temporary Speed Restrictions, Engineering Arrangements, Signalling & permanent Way alterations and General Instructions & notices for specific regions.
- The Periodical Operating Notice (PON) provides a long term summary of the Weekly Operating Notices for specific regions.
- The Special Traffic Notice (STN) provides weekly information on line possessions and changes to train timing for specific regions.

=== Documents produced by the Office of Road and Rail (formerly the Rail Regulator) ===
- Railway Safety Principles and Guidance ("The Blue Book").
- Guidance on Infrastructure

=== Documents produced by the Rail Safety and Standards Board ===
- The Rule Book provides definitions of railway equipment and operating procedures.
- Railway Group Standards. Several documents on current and former standards.

Available as Printed Books from Willsons Printers Newark Ltd

== See also ==
- Rail transport in the United Kingdom
