= Ladbroke Grove rail crash =

1999 rail accident in London

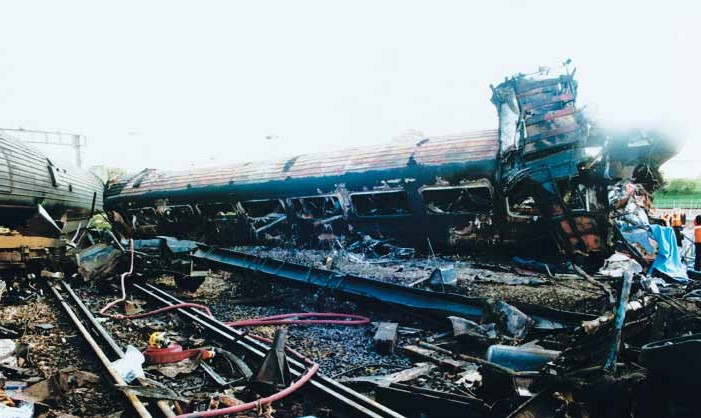
- Coach H of the First Great Western passenger train

Details
- Date: 5 October 1999; 26 years ago 08:08
- Location: Ladbroke Grove, London, England
- Coordinates: 51°31′30″N 00°13′03″W
- Country: England
- Line: Great Western Main Line
- Operator: Thames Trains and First Great Western
- Incident type: Collision, derailment
- Cause: Signal passed at danger

Statistics
- Trains: 2
- Deaths: 31
- Injured: 417

The Ladbroke Grove rail crash (also known as the Paddington rail crash) occurred on 5 October 1999 at Ladbroke Grove in London, England, when a Thames Trains passenger train passed a signal at danger, colliding almost head-on with a First Great Western passenger train. With 31 people killed and 417 injured, it was one of the worst rail accidents in 20th-century British history.

It was the second major crash on the Great Western Main Line in just over two years, the first being the Southall rail crash of September 1997, several miles west of this crash. Both crashes would have been prevented by an operational automatic train protection (ATP) system, wider fitting of which had been rejected on cost grounds. The crash severely damaged public confidence in the management and regulation of safety of Britain's privatised railway system.

A public inquiry into the crash by Lord Cullen was held in 2000. Since both the Paddington and Southall crashes had reopened public debate on ATP, a separate joint inquiry considering the issue in the light of both crashes was also held in 2000; it confirmed the rejection of ATP and the mandatory adoption of a cheaper and less effective system, but noted a mismatch between public opinion and cost-benefit analysis. Major changes in the formal responsibilities for management and regulation of safety of UK rail transport ensued.

== Incident ==
Track diagram of the crash, showing where the Thames Trains' Turbo, meant to wait for access to the westbound Down Main Line, ignored yellow warning signal SN87 (warning that the next signal is red), then passed red stop signal SN109, proceeding into the First Great Western's HST that was passing by on the eastbound Up Main Line

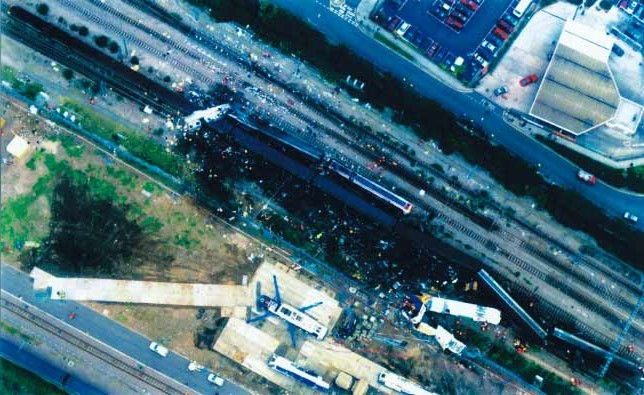
Metropolitan Police Service aerial image

At 08:06 BST on 5 October 1999, a British Rail Class 165 Turbo diesel multiple unit or DMU, No. 165 115, left Paddington Station on a Thames Trains service to Bedwyn railway station in Wiltshire, driven by 31-year-old Michael Hodder. From Paddington to Ladbroke Grove Junction (about 2 miles (3.2 km) to the west), the lines were bi-directional (signalled to allow trains to travel in either direction, in and out of the platforms of Paddington Station); beyond Ladbroke Grove the main line from London to South Wales and the West of England is a more conventional layout of two lines in each direction ('up' for travel to London, 'down' for travel away from London) carrying both fast and slow trains.

Being an outbound train, it would have been routed onto the down main line at Ladbroke Grove. It should have been held at a red signal at Portobello Junction until it could be rerouted safely. Instead, it passed the signal; and the points directed the multiple unit onto the Up Main Line at Ladbroke Grove. At about 8:09, as it was entering the Up Line, it collided nearly head-on and at a combined speed of approximately 130 mph (210 km/h) with the 06:03 First Great Western train from Cheltenham to Paddington.

The 06:03 InterCity 125 high speed train (HST) was driven by 52-year-old Brian Cooper. It consisted of a rake of eight Mark 3 coaches with a Class 43 diesel power car at each end, here led by No. 43 011. The chassis and body of the HST are notably stronger than the structure of the Class 165 DMU, the leading car of which was totally destroyed. The diesel fuel it was carrying was dispersed by the collision and ignited, leading to a series of fires in the wreckage, particularly in coach H near the front of the HST, which was completely burnt out.

The drivers of both trains were killed, as well as 29 others (23 on the Class 165, five on the HST as a result of the impact, with a further fatality as a result of the fire), and 417 people were injured. One of the survivors was the author Jilly Cooper, who was travelling on the HST.

== Immediate cause ==
The immediate cause of the disaster was determined to be the Class 165 passing a red signal (numbered SN109 on gantry 8 overhead beside four signals serving other tracks) at which the train should have been stopped. The signal was displaying a red aspect, and the preceding signal a single yellow which should have alerted the driver of the red signal ahead. Since Hodder, the driver, was killed in the collision, it was not possible to establish why he had passed the signal at danger. However, Hodder was inexperienced, having qualified as a driver only two weeks before the crash. His driver training was found to be defective on at least two grounds: assessing situation-handling skills, and being notified of recent local incidents of signals passed at danger (SPAD). The local signals were known to have caused other near misses – SN109 had been passed at danger on eight occasions in six years, but Hodder had no specific warning of this. Furthermore, 5 October 1999 was a clear day and at just past 08:00 the sun would have been low, behind Hodder, meaning that sunlight would reflect off yellow aspects, reducing visibility. The driver of a previous westbound train reported that "all the signals right the way across all lit up like a Christmas tree" at gantry 6 at about 7:50 that morning. Poor signal placement meant that Hodder would have seen the reflection of the yellow aspects of SN109 at a point where his view of the red aspect (but not of any other signal on the gantry) was still obstructed. The inquiry considered it more probable than not that the poor visibility of SN109, caused by not only its own position but the positioning of other signals at gantry 8, along with the reflections of sunlight, led Hodder to believe that he was able to proceed and pass the red signal.

== Contributory factors ==
The inquiry noted that the lines out of and into Paddington were known to be prone to SPAD mishaps – hosting an unusual concentration of eight SPADs at signal SN109 in the preceding six years – and attempted to identify the underlying causes.

=== Problems with signal visibility ===
Paddington approaches had been resignalled by British Rail in the early 1990s to allow bidirectional working. The number of signals and limited trackside space meant that most signals were in gantries over the tracks; the curvature of the lines meant that it was not always obvious which signal was for which track. Reflective line-identification signs had therefore been added but, the inquiry report noted, they were closer to the signal to the right hand side than to the signal for the line to which they related. However, misreading of which signal related to which track cannot have caused the fatal crash, because at the time all the other gantry 8 signals westbound were also showing red. Local spacing between signals and points was designed to allow fast through-running by freight trains, such that gantry 8 was less than 100 metres (330 ft) west of a road bridge not at high level; this compromised the distance from which the signal could be seen by drivers of trains leaving Paddington. To allow the higher ('proceed') aspects to be seen sooner, the standard signals (with the four aspects arranged vertically) were replaced with non-standard 'reverse L' signals, with the red aspect to the left of the lower yellow. The resignalling had been implemented ahead of formal HMRI approval; awaited at the time of the crash.

The line had been electrified to allow the new Heathrow Express service to operate from 1994 with overhead electrification equipment that further obstructed drivers' view of signals:

... from the outset there was not an adequate overall consideration of the difficulties which would face drivers, in particular in signal sighting, on which the safety of travellers critically depended. Secondly, when difficulties did emerge, there was not an adequate reconsideration of the scheme. There was a resistance to questioning what had already been done. Cost, delay and interference with the performance objectives underlay that resistance.

The red aspect of SN109 was particularly badly obscured by the overhead electrification equipment; it was last of all the gantry 8 signal aspects to become clearly visible to the driver of a Class 165 approaching from Paddington.

=== Problems with signal visibility management ===
All new or altered signals or which had multiple SPADs should have been reviewed for sighting issues by a 'signal sighting committee', but none had been held for signals around Paddington since Railtrack assumed responsibility for this in April 1994. An internal audit in March 1999 had reported this, but a follow-up audit in September 1999 found no evidence of any remedial action being taken.

The failure to have signal sighting committees convened was persistent and serious. It was due ... to a combination of incompetent management and inadequate process, the latter consisting in the absence of a process at a higher level for identifying whether those who were responsible for convening such committees were or were not doing so.

There had been over the years a number of proposals or recommendations for the risk assessment of the signalling in the Paddington area; none of them was carried into effect. Multiple SPADs at SN109 in August 1998 should have triggered a risk assessment; none took place. An inquiry into a February 1998 SPAD at SN109 had already recommended risk assessment of signalling on the Paddington–Ladbroke Grove bi-directional lines; this and many other inquiry recommendations had not been implemented: the Railtrack employee with formal responsibility for action-tracking had been told his responsibility ended once someone accepted an action, and did not extend to checking that they had acted upon it.

=== 'Disjointed and ineffective' SPAD reduction initiatives ===
Between February 1998 and the accident there had been four separate groups set up with the aim of reducing SPADs; their existence, membership and functions overlapped. A Railtrack manager told the inquiry how he struggled on his arrival in October 1998 to understand how "so many apparently good people could produce so little action": people had burdens that were too complex; they were not prioritising; people were "square pegs in round holes"; some were not competent; and, in summary, "the culture of the place had gone seriously adrift over many years". The chief executive of Railtrack spoke of a seemingly endemic culture of complacency and inaction, which he said reflected the culture of the old British Rail: "The culture is one in which decisions are delegated upwards. There has been little empowerment. People have tended to manage reactively, not proactively. The basic management discipline of 'plan-do-review' is absent the further down the organisation one goes."

=== Problems with driver training ===
Thames Trains inherited a driver training programme from British Rail, which had changed to the point where in February 1999, a concerned incoming training manager commissioned an external audit which reported

The trainers did not appear to be following the training course syllabus and supporting notes as they considered these to be 'not fit for purpose' with inappropriate time allowances for some sessions. The traction and introduction to driving section of the course has been extended and the six week route learning session is being used as additional practical handling.

Indeed, Michael Hodder's 16 weeks' practical training had been given by a trainer who felt that "I was not there to teach ... the routes. I was totally to teach ... how to drive a Turbo"; the training manager was unaware of this. Details of signals which had been repeatedly passed at danger should have been supplied to trainers and passed on to trainees; no trainer had done so, and the practical trainer quoted above was unaware that SN109 was a multi-SPAD signal. Testing of trainees was similarly unstructured and unstandardised, with no clear pass/fail criteria. Under the previous British Railways training regime, trainees would have spent far longer in training and once qualified, were not allowed to drive over the notoriously difficult approach to/from Paddington until they had at least two years' experience on less complex routes. Hodder had only qualified 13 days earlier; he was ex-navy with no previous experience as a railway worker, but no special attention was paid to this in either training or testing.

It must be concluded therefore that [the driver's] training was not adequate for the task for which he was being prepared. The very favourable comments made as to his progress by his various teachers have to be viewed against the background that his teachers were working with a less than perfect training programme.

== Other issues ==
=== Train protection ===
The Class 165 unit had been fitted with an Automatic Warning System (AWS) which required the driver to acknowledge a warning every time he approached a signal not at green. It thus did not distinguish between a signal at caution (yellow) and red (danger). If an Automatic Train Protection (ATP) system had been fitted and working it would have automatically applied brakes to prevent the train going beyond any signal at red. National adoption of ATP, British Rail's preferred train protection system, had been recommended after the Clapham Junction rail crash, but later abandoned because the safety benefits were considered not great enough to justify the cost. After a previous SPAD, Thames Trains had commissioned a cost–benefit analysis (CBA) study specific to the Paddington situation which came to the same conclusion. The Ladbroke Grove accident was felt to cast doubt on the wisdom of these decisions. However, the Cullen inquiry confirmed that CBA would not support the adoption of ATP by Thames Trains.

=== Flank protection ===
The signalling system on the approaches to Paddington did not incorporate 'flank protection' (where the points beyond a stop signal are automatically set to direct the train away from the path which would cause a collision). This would have routed the train running past SN109 onto the Down Relief line. This should have been considered at the design stage. The reasons for not engineering flank protection were not known, although it is more difficult to find a safe diversion path with bidirectional signalling and in some cases another train might also be on the Down Relief line, but it was noted that the introduction of Automatic Train Protection (ATP) had been thought to be imminent at previous safety reviews. Flank protection would have increased the 'overlap' (the distance for which a train could run past the signal before fouling lines) at SN109; the desirability of doing so should have been considered by the risk assessment which had not taken place.

=== Response of signalmen ===
The written instructions for Railtrack signalling centre staff at Slough were that as soon as they realised that a train had passed a signal at danger they should set signals to danger and immediately send a radio "emergency all stop" signal to the driver of the train by Cab Secure Radio (CSR) as soon as they realised that it had done so. In the event, only when the Thames train was 200 m (660 ft) past the signal did they start to send a radio "emergency all stop" signal (it is not clear whether the signal was actually sent before the crash). Their understanding of the instructions was that they should wait to see if the driver stopped of his own accord before attempting to contact him; this interpretation was supported by their immediate manager. The signalmen had never been trained in the use of CSR, nor had they ever used it in response to a SPAD.

The general picture which emerged was of a slack and complacent regime, which was not alive to the potentially dire consequences of a SPAD or of the way in which signallers could take action to deal with such situations.

=== Regulatory shortcomings ===
The Health and Safety Executive's HM Railway Inspectorate was also criticised for its inspection procedures. The then head of HSE told the Inquiry the HSE were concerned about, first, the length of time taken for the approval of the signalling scheme; secondly, the slow progress by Railtrack and the HMRI in bringing issues to a conclusion; and, thirdly, the inadequate risk analysis. Matters had not been followed up with more urgency. More could have been done to enforce health and safety legislation. She attributed these deficiencies to three causes:

- a lack of resources on the part of the HMRI;
- a lack of vigour by the HMRI in pursuing issues; and
- the placing of too much trust in the duty holders

== Wider ramifications ==
=== National policy on train protection systems ===
A fortnight before the crash the HSE had announced an intention to require the adoption of TPWS (an upgrade of AWS, which could stop trains travelling at less than 70 mph (110 km/h) within the overlap distance of a red signal, delivering, it assessed, about 2/3 the safety benefits of ATP at much lower cost) by 2004 (advanced, a week after the crash, to 2003).

The separate joint inquiry on the problem nationally noted that ATP and contrasting AWS introduced since about 1958 (and therefore TPWS) had continuing reliability problems and were obsolescent technology inconsistent with the impending standardisation EU-wide per the ETCS European Train Control System. In the year between Ladbroke Grove and the joint inquiry the rail industry (if not the general public) had become largely committed to the adoption of TPWS. Consequently, although the joint inquiry expressed considerable reservations about the effectiveness of TPWS it concurred with its adoption.

The joint inquiry noted that public reaction to catastrophic rail accidents ... should be and is taken into account in the making of decisions about rail safety but did not align with the output of CBA (cost-benefits analysis). Any future ATP system will entail expenditure at levels many times higher than that indicated by any approach based upon CBA. Despite its cost, there appears to be a general consensus in favour of ATP. Both TPWS and ETCS would be mandatory and therefore their cost implications need not be considered by any body other than the UK government and the EU Commission.

=== Management and regulation of rail safety ===
The inquiry noted evidence that railway safety statistics had not worsened after privatisation, nor had there been any evidence that however privatisation had been carried out it would have been detrimental to safety. Concerns were however expressed about how privatisation had been carried out:

- The fragmentation of the industry had created numerous, complex interfaces exacerbated by defensive or insular attitudes (expected to worsen in the future as managers who had broad, sobering experience in BR passed out of the system). It also gave problems with the management, development and implementation of large-scale projects; and meant that little real research and development was being carried out.
- The quality of safety leadership and communications varied between the various successor organisations.
- A stress on performance targets had diluted the perceived importance of safety. Cullen contrasted multimillion-pound penalties for poor punctuality with much lower fines for serious safety breaches.
- Train Operating Company (TOC) franchises had been awarded for too short a period, and with inadequate consideration of safety aspects.
- Railtrack relied extensively on contractors to carry out safety critical work; there were too many contracting organisations, contracts were for too short a period, and were inadequately supervised by Railtrack.

Beyond exhortations to do better, the Inquiry recommended changes in the industry structure. Railtrack had not merely had responsibility for railways infrastructure, but also a lead responsibility for safety: for acceptance of the Safety Case of each TOC and for setting "Railway Group Standards" (system-wide standards on matters affecting safety). Since it also had commercial interests in these issues TOCs were unhappy with this: Cullen recommended that safety case acceptance should be directly by HSE in future, and a new body should be set up to manage Railway Group Standards.

In 1996 ScotRail had initiated the creation of a confidential rail safety reporting system (later to become CIRAS) formed from an independent panel chiefly from Strathclyde University. Other TOCs expressed interest and others in Scotland voluntarily joined the system. Following the Ladbroke Grove rail crash, Deputy Prime Minister John Prescott mandated that all mainline rail in the UK come under the Confidential Incident Reporting & Analysis System (CIRAS) to involve every rail employee in the rail safety process. CIRAS now provides services to all rail workers and operating sectors throughout England, Scotland, Wales and the Republic of Ireland (ROI).

The Railways Inspectorate had a responsibility for advising on and inspecting against matters affecting railway safety; they were also the usual investigating body for serious railway crashes. Cullen felt that there was "a strong argument for an investigating body which enjoys real and perceived independence" and therefore recommended that rail accident investigation should become the responsibility of a separate body.

== Aftermath ==
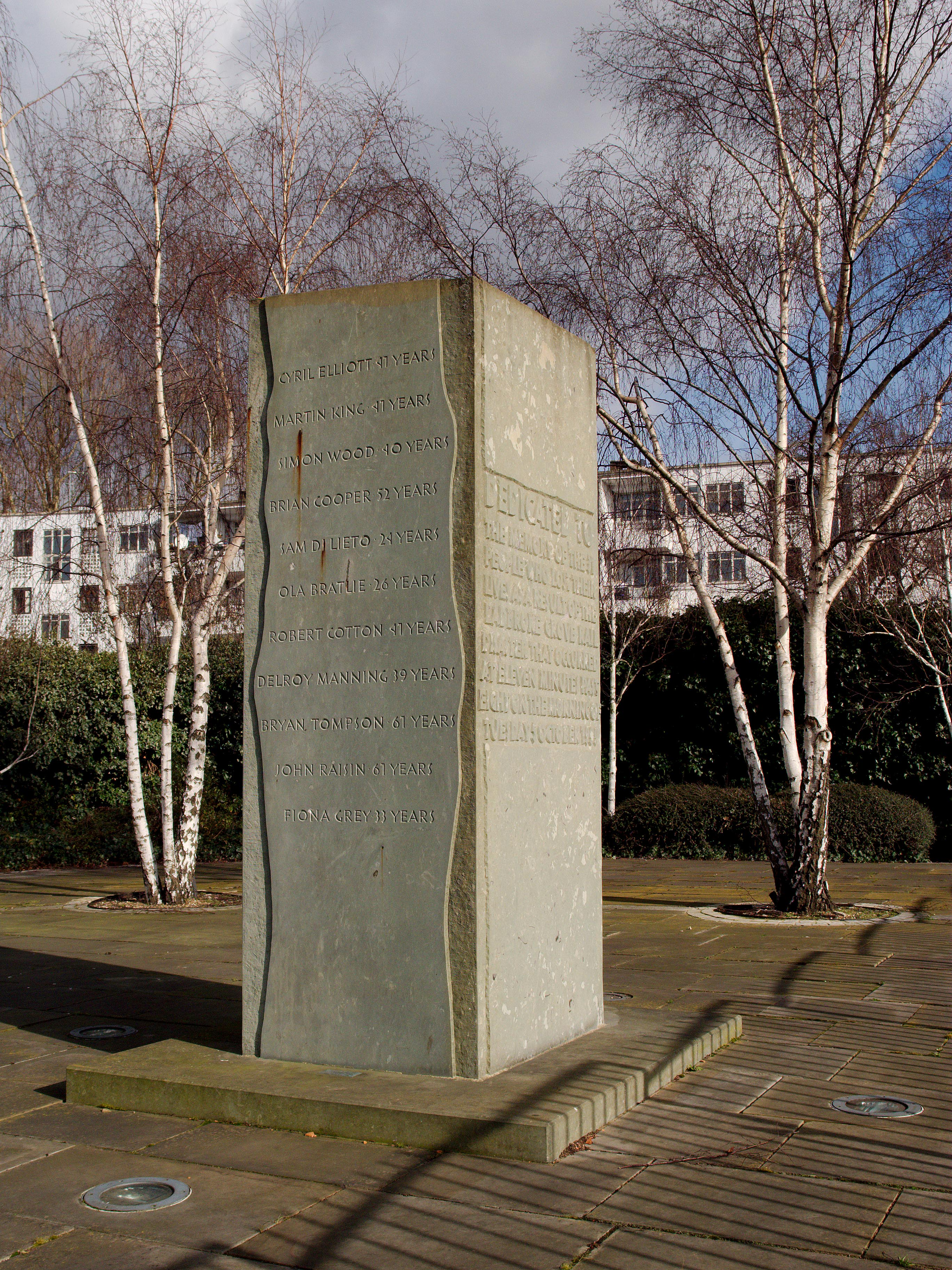
The memorial erected close to the crash site

The recommendations of Lord Cullen's inquiry into the crash led to the creation in 2003 of the Rail Safety and Standards Board and in 2005 of the Rail Accident Investigation Branch, in addition to the Railway Inspectorate. Standards-setting, accident investigation and regulatory functions were from then on clearly separated, on the model of the aviation industry.

On 5 April 2004, Thames Trains was fined a record £2 million after admitting violations of health and safety law in connection with the crash and ordered to pay £75,000 in legal costs.

On 31 October 2006, Network Rail (the successor body to Railtrack, formed in the wake of a subsequent train crash at Hatfield) pleaded guilty to charges under the Health and Safety at Work etc. Act 1974 in relation to the accident. It was fined £4 million on 30 March 2007 and ordered to pay £225,000 in legal costs.

Signal SN109 was brought back into service in February 2006. It and many other signals in the Paddington area are now single-lens type signals.

A memorial garden and cenotaph has been created, partially overlooking the site, accessible from a supermarket car park, at 51.5251°N 0.2160°W.

Heavy damage to power car 43011 saw it written off, officially withdrawn in November. After the completion of the inquiry it was cut up by Sims Metals in Crewe, Cheshire in June 2002. The Turbo unit was written off, the front two cars were scrapped; the rear car was undamaged, able to be used for spare parts.

In a 2007 case, arising out of a 2001 manslaughter committed by one of the victims of the crash, Kerrie Gray, who experienced post-traumatic stress disorder (PTSD) and went on to stab a random pedestrian, legal issues were raised regarding the legal principle known as ex turpi causa non oritur actio, which holds that illegal actions cannot form a basis for damages claims. Mr Gray pled guilty in 2002 to the offence of manslaughter by reason of diminished responsibility, and was detained in psychiatric care as a result. In 2005 he sued Thames Trains, along with Network Rail, seeking compensation for the loss of the earnings which he should have earned to date and might have subsequently have earned if he had not suffered PTSD, committed the offence and been detained. The High Court initially, and the House of Lords on appeal, held in support of Thames Trains and Network Rail that: "In so far as the claimant's claim relates to losses suffered after the commission of the act of manslaughter on 19 August 2001, that claim will not be entertained by the court and must be dismissed."

Author Jilly Cooper was a passenger in one of the derailed carriages and crawled through a window to escape, later saying that she believed she would not get out alive. Passenger Pam Warren wrote the book From Behind the Mask, which narrates her experiences during the crash, her recovery, and how its affects on her life led her to become a public speaker and advocate for railway safety.

== See also ==
- Southall rail crash – an earlier incident on the Great Western Main Line caused by a SPAD, also involving a High Speed Train
- 2005 Glendale train crash – an incident in the United States which was also followed by a fire caused by spilt diesel
