= ORCATS =

Computer system, used by railways in Great Britain

ORCATS (Operational Research Computerised Allocation of Tickets to Services) is a large centralised legacy computer system used on passenger railways in Great Britain. It is used for real time reservation and revenue sharing on interavailable tickets between train operating companies (TOCs). The system is used to divide ticket revenue when a ticket or journey involves trains operated by multiple TOCs. The system was owned by British Rail, and is now managed by the Rail Delivery Group.

== History ==
Before nationalisation, a similar function was carried out by the Railway Clearing House.
