= National Rail Conditions of Travel =

Document for consumers of railway in United Kingdom

The National Rail Conditions of Travel (NRCoT) is a contractual document setting out the consumer's rights and responsibilities when travelling on the National Rail railway network in Great Britain. These replaced the National Rail Conditions of Carriage (NRCoC) as of 1 October 2016.

== Background ==
When a train ticket is purchased, a contract is established. The NRCoT are the principal terms of that contract between traveller and train operating company (TOC), which have been established by the Rail Delivery Group. The document is available for public viewing at the National Rail website, as a free PDF download or from any staffed ticket office.

Additional terms do apply to travellers, primarily from two sources:

- For certain ticket types (such as those purchased at discount in advance), the TOCs concerned apply additional terms and conditions on top of the NRCoT.
- The NRCoT cover the entitlement and restrictions of travellers, however they are not the only document to do so. Under the Transport Act 2000 (section 219), the Railway Bylaws also apply, though more generally.

== Content ==
Whilst the NRCoT are referred to on all train tickets, at stations, and on Internet sites selling tickets for rail travel, very few travellers read the document, unless they find themselves in dispute with a rail company on some matter. They are, however, of use to the consumer, because they afford considerable rights to the traveller with regards ticket validity. This has become a matter of significant public interest recently, in view of the complex and convoluted pricing structure of rail tickets in Great Britain.

Delay Repay compensation
Ticket held	Amount payable
Single ticket, or Return ticket with delay on both the outward and return journey	50% of the price paid
Return ticket with delay on outward or return journey	50% of the price paid for the relevant portion of the journey
Season ticket	The discount or compensation arrangements in the relevant train company's Passenger's Charter apply

== See also ==
- Rail transport in the United Kingdom
