= Rail Safety and Standards Board =

- Abbreviation: RSSB
- Formation: 1 April 2003
- Legal status: Active
- Location: 25 Fenchurch Avenue, London, EC3M 5AD
- Region served: Great Britain
- Chief Executive: Mark Phillips
- Chair: Mike Brown
- Website: www.rssb.co.uk

The Rail Safety and Standards Board (RSSB) is a British independent company limited by guarantee. Interested parties include various rail industry organisations, including Network Rail, train operating companies (TOCs), and rolling stock companies (ROSCOs). The RSSB operates as a not-for-profit entity, its primary purpose being to bring about improved health and safety performance throughout Britain's railway network.

In the fulfilment of this purpose, the Board undertakes numerous safety-focused monitoring and continuous improvement programmes, such as the railway supplier quality assurance scheme RISQS and the Confidential Incident Reporting & Analysis System (CIRAS). It is also works with operators to identify and address risks, and is responsible for the updating and issuing of the British Railway Rule Book, amongst its other activities. The majority of Britain's train operators are obliged to be members of the RSSB, and to ensure compliance with their membership obligations across all of their operations. During the 2010s, the RSSB was restructured in order to better fulfil its purpose.

== History ==
The Rail Safety and Standards Board (RSSB) which was established on 1 April 2003 as a result of a direct recommendation of the public inquiry into the Ladbroke Grove rail crash. According to the Office of Rail and Road (ORR) regulatory body: "The RSSB's principal objective is to lead and facilitate the rail industry's work to achieve continuous improvement in the health and safety performance of the railways in Great Britain." In accordance with this principle, the agency's prime purpose is to lead the various other entities associated with Great Britain's rail network, including the ORR, rail infrastructure owner and maintainer Network Rail, and the Rail Delivery Group operating body. Amongst its responsibilities, the RSSB is responsible for the publication and updating of the British Railway Rule Book, which defines technical standards and operating procedures upon the railway.

The RSSB's ownership is divided amongst a range of different organisations in the British railway sector, including Network Rail, infrastructure managers, train operating companies, and rolling stock companies. As a condition of their licence obligations, the majority of Britain's train operators are required by the ORR to be members of the RSSB and to comply with the obligations of membership. The RSSB is financed primarily via levies sourced from its members. The ORR itself supervises the RSSB, performing periodic independent reviews of the organisation for such purposes.

Operationally, the RSSB has routinely employed various techniques to assess and manage risk, particularly during incident investigations, to help drive improvements in the rail industry's health and safety policies. It operates multiple teams of inspectors that act not only to ensure legal compliance and appropriate certification is obtained and maintained by the organisations involved, but to foster a climate of continuous improvement throughout all elements of the rail industry. To this end, the RSSB has been committed to the continued development of various models, tools, and competences to support its members. New models and tools have also been developed through the stewardship of the RSSB.

RSSB is also responsible for operating the railway supplier assurance scheme RISQS, as well as the confidential incident reporting line, Confidential Incident Reporting & Analysis System (CIRAS). It also supporting several cross-industry groups for the purpose of addressing key safety concerns, and encouraged collaboration to address such concerns. Since its establishment, the RSSB has sought to foster greater levels of customer engagement to better go about its mission. The RSSB promotes the Trackoff programme promoting rail safety within schools, as well as the Sustainable Rail Programme.

Under the supervision and direction of the RSSB, various safety-related changes have been introduced upon Britain's railways. One example is new standards for high-visibility clothing, which have been credited with a measurable improvement in the effective safety levels for rail workers and other staff interacting with the network. The specifications for Rail Industry Standard RIS-3279-TOM (fluorescent orange) high-visibility clothing, suitable for use on railways in the United Kingdom, are published by the RSSB. In late 2019, the RSSB announced that it was formulating a safety strategy to allow hydrogen-powered trains to be routinely operated upon the mainline rail network.

During the 2010s, the RSSB has undergone structural changes so that the mutual obligations between the Board and its member organisations can be better fulfilled. These alterations to business practices have included a greater emphasis on transparency, the clarification of its core functions, improvements to communications, and a new focus on being proactive in its undertakings. It is reportedly intended that these changes, which were performed primarily in response to recommendations issued by the ORR, shall help drive improvements in rail safety standards while also delivering a more efficient and sustainable railway. According to the RSSB's chief operating officer Johnny Schute, a greater level of engagement between the Board and the membership is a major priority, and that industry players typically ought to be more proactive and vocal in matters of safety.
