= Fare avoidance =

Lawful usage of knowledge to travel with less cost

Fare avoidance, as distinct from fare evasion, is the lawful use of knowledge to travel using tickets which cost significantly less than the 'normal' fare for a given journey, which is what one might be expected to use. It is common in some parts of the world with complex travel networks, notably the National Rail network of Great Britain.

The term is sometimes used as a synonym of fare evasion.

== Methods of avoiding fares ==
=== Split ticketing ===
The practice of buying multiple tickets instead of one ticket for a transport itinerary is called split ticketing.

Some rail systems or airlines calculate fares based on an individual route's popularity and a host of other factors in addition to mileage. Thus, the total cost of two tickets, from A to P and from P to B, may be less than one ticket from A to B, giving an opportunity to save money, especially if P is en route between A and B.

For example, a train from London Paddington to Bristol can stop on the way at Didcot Parkway. When a split ticket is used, this has been shown to reduce the fare from £118 to £75, helping travellers make a significant saving. This is a well-known station to split tickets and among others has been used for this purpose.

=== Starting and stopping short ===
Even if mileage is the sole factor in pricing apart from discounts, applicable to journeys exceeding a certain mileage, there may be an anomaly for borderline cases. For example, a rail system may charge a fare of $100 for the first 100 km and $6 for each additional 10 km. A ticket from A to B, 380 km apart, costs $268. If a discount of 15% applies to mileages exceeding 400 km only, a ticket from A to C, 420 km apart, would cost $292 × 85% = $248.20. A traveller may buy a ticket from A to C and alight at B, saving $19.80.

=== Running a negative balance on stored-value tickets ===
Frequently, smart cards, as a convenience, allow the user to run a negative balance. If this balance is greater than the cost of the card, the user may profit by simply discarding the card and purchasing another.

== Examples ==
=== Hong Kong ===
In the MTR system of Hong Kong, Lo Wu and Lok Ma Chau station of East Rail line serve as checkpoints for rail passengers between Hong Kong and mainland China and vice versa. If a passenger travels to/from stations from urban area (on or before Kowloon Tong), it is possible to save money by splitting the journey into 2 legs. For example, travelling directly from Hung Hom to Lo Wu costs HK$40.60. If the passenger exits and enters again at Sheung Shui station, the journey costs HK$36.50 (Hung Hom - Sheung Shui: HK$10.80, Sheung Shui - Lo Wu: $25.70), which is HK$4.10 lower than the direct journey.

In the era of Common stored value tickets, it was possible to travel on the whole network regardless of the fare as long as there was some value on the ticket, which would be recycled when it ran out of value. Therefore, passengers could save fare by keeping tickets with low value (as low as HK$0.10) and use them to travel for long distance journeys.

=== Sweden ===
The rail operator SJ had a loophole around 2010, where ticket prices were calculated the shortest way, even if going a detour with a train change. It was possible to book a short distance ticket with an extreme detour and end the journey halfway. This loophole has been tightened.

=== United Kingdom ===
The comprehensive Great Britain National Fares Manual, Southern section

The privatisation of British Rail has resulted in a complex fare structure, with passengers regularly mis-sold tickets, or not aware of the full entitlement a ticket gives them. Enthusiasts, and those with connections to the industry, use the Great Britain railway technical manuals to identify which fares offer best value. This often involves purchasing tickets for stations which one has no intention of actually visiting, for a number of reasons. Since rail journeys in Great Britain are not always priced on mileage, often it is cheaper to buy a ticket from A to D via B and C, solely to travel from B to C (in some cases A = B or C = D). When splitting a journey it is important that the train stops at the location where you transfer from one ticket to another.

In the National Rail network, split ticketing is legal as long as the train calls at the stations where a change of tickets occurs, and, unless on advance tickets or where break of journey is specifically prohibited by restrictions, starting or ending a journey short is also legal.

There are many applications that have been developed to carry out split ticketing, for example Trainline and TrainSplit. These applications search for the lowest combination of tickets for a given journey

=== Ireland ===
Iarnród Éireann specifically prohibits split ticketing and starting / stopping short under its conditions of carriage.

Item 10 prohibits starting / stopping short:

Subject to Condition 8, any passenger using a ticket for any station, either beyond or short of that for which the ticket is valid will be liable to pay the full ordinary single fare for the journey made and he or she may be liable to prosecution.

Item 11 prohibits split ticketing:

Except where specially authorised, passengers are not permitted to re-book at an intermediate station for the purpose of continuing their journey by the same train. Two or more tickets covering different portions of one journey are not available unless the fares paid for such tickets are equivalent in amount to the price of a single journey ticket between the same points. Any passenger using two or more tickets covering different portions of one journey will be liable to pay the full ordinary single fare for the journey made and he or she may be liable to prosecution.

This is in direct contrast of Great Britain, which has specifically stated that such practices are legal in its National Rail network.

=== Taiwan ===
Taichung offers its residents a travel card which offers 10 km of free bus travel. Therefore, it is possible to travel in the city for free by alighting just short of the 10 km limit, and changing to another bus at that point.

=== United States ===
On the Amtrak system, state-sponsored trains such as the Pennsylvanian can sometimes carry much lower fares than Northeast Corridor trains. Travellers between New York and Philadelphia could purchase a ticket from New York to one of the branch line stations on the Harrisburg branch of the Northeast Corridor, and disembark in Philadelphia leaving the feeder portion of the ticket unused. Although the traveller would travel over the same physical line infrastructure, the cheaper ticket would only be valid on trains that were continuing beyond Philadelphia onto the feeder route, such as the Keystone Service trains.

BART has several fares where the sum of the fares A–P + P–B is less than the direct fare A–B. The most dramatic is Fremont to Dublin/Pleasanton. The direct fare (paid by Clipper card, effective January 1, 2018 thru December 31, 2019) is $4.95; however if one exits and re-enters at Bay Fair (where a transfer is required anyway), the fare is $2.00 for each leg, for a total of $4.00.

The Washington Metro sells a 7-day Short Trip Pass good for any trip during peak hours (when fares, effective 2014, can range up to $5.90) up to the maximum off-peak fare of $3.60, clearly under the assumption that it would not be worth people's time to exit and re-board. However, since someone traveling from West Falls Church to Eisenhower Avenue would have to transfer at Rosslyn station, rather than paying the $1.40 fee for the $5.00 peak fare they could exit and re-enter the paid area easily (as Rosslyn is one of 3 Metro stations with on-platform faregates), and have each of the two segments of their journey covered by their pass.

== See also ==
- Airline booking ploys
