= National Routeing Guide =

Rail transport document

A copy of the 2002 edition of the National Routeing Guide.

The National Routeing Guide is a document, the definitive resource on the validity of rail tickets for the purpose of rail travel in Great Britain. As stated by the Rail Regulator, "[it] sets out passengers' rights to use the network flexibly". It is a book produced by the Rail Delivery Group, which is carried by any rail ticket inspector and is also on hand for station staff.

It is one of the technical railway manuals which exist as part of the operating of the rail network of Great Britain, many of which are now in the public domain.

Customers generally encounter the document in specific circumstances, when they wish to prove (or check) the validity of their ticket on a route which might at first not appear obvious. Since most rail travellers make 'simple' journeys, many will never encounter it. However, when making more complex journeys, it is important to stay "on route". The guide defines what this means. Individual tickets may restrict holders to a subset of the acceptable routes, usually by requiring them to travel through a particular station.

== Format ==
- The published guide is available online in PDF format, in six distinct sections (termed A-F), and includes an introduction and worked examples. This is identical to the version carried by rail workers, since it is derived from the Rail Delivery Group website.
- A public paper copy of the guide is made available in the Office of Rail & Road library, which is open to the public by appointment. The Office of Rail & Road website also contains copies of the original 1996 Routeing Guide and the amended 1997 Routeing Guide.
- In theory, paper copies are also available for public purchase, which in 2002 cost £12.50, the same price as one volume of the multi-part "National Fares Manual", which provides details of all fares on the network in 7 volumes. Enthusiasts using the routeing guide to identify good value travel often use the two together. However, paper copies are currently difficult to obtain and it is unknown if publication has ceased, although since the document is covered under the Freedom of Information Act a paper copy may be requested from the Department for Transport.

== Issues of value to the traveller ==
The routeing guide makes possible some of the recently publicised ticketing anomalies in the GB rail network such as saving money by purchasing tickets for long journeys as several discrete journeys instead, for example. As such it is a powerful tool in the arsenal of the knowing consumer, given the current complexity of ticket choice on the GB rail network. It is also important for travellers who contemplate a different route when faced with disruption; under these circumstances staff may stamp or sign a ticket as valid via a different route.

When it was introduced, its primary aim was to "provide passengers with certainty about what travel their ticket buys them", after many years of ambiguity over 'reasonable' journeys, therefore passengers are now quite within their rights to use it as a point of reference, since it has been written and approved by the transport companies.

=== The on-route principle ===
The primary concern of those travelling is staying on a route acceptable for the ticket they have purchased. The customer is always on-route if they can answer yes to at least one of the below, according to section A of the guide:

- Is the train an advertised direct train from origin to destination?
- Is the customer on the shortest (by distance) route between origin and destination? (according to the mile distances listed in the National Rail Timetable, in theory, though not always in practice.)

The full routeing guide is consulted only upon answering 'no' to both questions. This can occur when the customer wishes or needs to change trains several times, either with a view to travelling on a particular line (for example to connect with a faster train), or because of a desire to break a journey at a given station not directly on the 'expected' route.

==== Doubling back ====
Passing through the same station twice is almost always forbidden, except where a rule or 'easement' allows it.

==== Easements ====
These easements are exceptions to the acceptable routes which are otherwise explicitly defined, and are listed in Section E of the Guide for easy reference. They are simple to understand one-line rules, and exist to ensure that in most circumstances the simplest journey is acceptable.

For example, the "no doubling back" rule normally requires travellers changing from one line to another to change at the junction station. However, such stations are often small and poorly served, so local easements often exist to allow travel to the nearest major station. In many cases this enables the traveller to remain on 'fast' services.

"Easement 700221: Customers travelling from, to or via Truro to St Ives ... may double back between St Erth and Penzance. This easement applies in both directions."

Others are matters of convenience:

"Easement 020003: Passengers for Aviemore and Carrbridge are permitted to alight from the sleeper at Inverness and double back to their destination in the morning."

Some easements are negative, forbidding a route that might otherwise be acceptable. Some may be both positive and negative:

"Easement 000026: Customers travelling from Micklefield, Garforth, East Garforth, and Cross Gates to or from London, route YORK, may travel either route YORK or route LEEDS. Route ANY PERMITTED only allows travel via LEEDS."

The relevant section of the Guide, which is currently available at the Rail Delivery Group website, details more than five hundred different easements.

=== Disabled access ===
Train operating companies may make special arrangements for disabled passengers, who have further exemptions on an individual case basis. This allows for different routes in certain situations, such as where normal practice is to walk between two nearby stations on different lines to catch a connecting train, which wheelchair users might find difficult. There are however no clear stated rules for defining what is "reasonable" for disabled people—this is presumably a matter of discretion. Some journeys must involve walks of up to 10 minutes in some cases between stations to make a connection (e.g. Farnborough (Main) to Farnborough North, Ash Vale to North Camp)

== Permitted routes ==
Three types of routes are acceptable: direct trains, shortest route, or mapped routes. The first two are simple and outlined above. Almost the whole of the routeing guide is taken up with specifying the third for the entire country.

=== Principle ===
- The GB rail network has stations which are deemed routeing points. These are principal stations, or junctions, shown in green on the adjacent map. Groups of nearby stations are sometimes treated as a single routeing point (e.g. "Portsmouth Stations").
- All other stations are associated with one or more routeing points. When a station has more than one routeing point available, fares from each routeing point to the other station are compared, and only those where the fare is equal to or cheaper than the overall journey are deemed appropriate.

=== Journeys ===
The rules can be summarised thus:

- Where both stations have a common routeing point, only the shortest route between them is valid.
- Otherwise, for every pair of routeing points the guide lists at least one map (or series of maps) that may be used to get from one point to the other. These maps in turn define which lines are valid between routeing points. Any route on these maps is valid so long as it does not involve doubling back (passing through the same station twice), unless there is a specific easement allowing doubling back, or the doubling back is done within a station group for the purposes of interchange.
- Some ticket types have specific route restrictions, e.g. 'not London', or prescriptions e.g. 'Reading'.

The guide allows many journeys which one might not expect. Travelling from Cardiff to Cambridge via Swansea, Shrewsbury, and Birmingham is acceptable, for instance, rather than simply via London. Generally there are a large number of permitted routes which are rarely used because they are inconvenient, but which are nevertheless legitimate. Some travellers have reported being charged extra for 'special' routes, however.

== See also ==
- Rail transport in the United Kingdom
