= Confidential Incident Reporting & Analysis System =

Transportation safety reporting service in the UK

Confidential Incident Reporting & Analysis Service
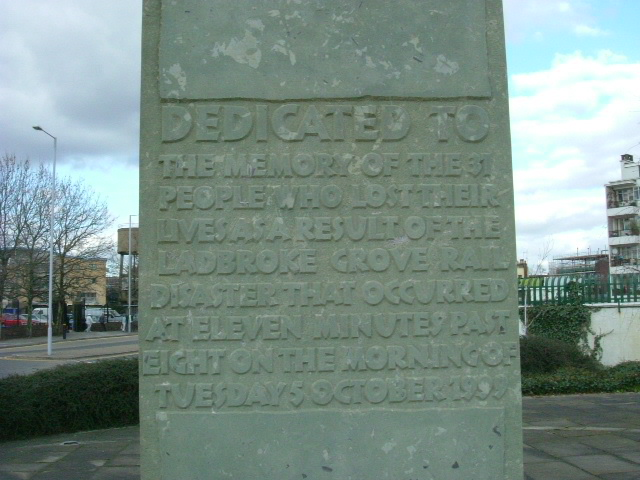
- Ladbroke Grove rail crash memorial commemorating the 31 people who died near this spot in October 1999
- Abbreviation: CIRAS
- Formation: 1996
- Founder: ScotRail
- Type: Confidential safety reporting service
- Purpose: Provides a reporting process for UK transport workers to report incidents or concerns about facilities, equipment, conditions, or procedures.
- Region served: United Kingdom
- Official language: English

The Confidential Incident Reporting & Analysis Service (CIRAS), formerly the Confidential Incident Reporting & Analysis System, is a confidential safety reporting service for health, safety and wellbeing concerns raised by workers in the UK transport industry. It is funded by members and run independently, though is a wholly owned subsidiary of Rail Safety and Standards Board (RSSB). The service covers the following sectors: passenger and freight train operators, light rail, Network Rail and its suppliers, London Underground, and Transport for London (TfL) bus operators.

== History ==
CIRAS was originally created in 1996 by a team from Strathclyde University. Other rail lines expressed interest in the project and several rail lines in Scotland voluntarily joined the system. After the Ladbroke Grove rail crash in 1999, John Prescott mandated that all mainline rail in the UK come under CIRAS effective in 2000. From 2001 until 2009, the CIRAS Charitable Trust provided funding for operations, before it formally became part of RSSB. As well as providing a service to all UK rail workers and operating throughout England, Scotland and Wales, CIRAS extended its reach to include London bus operators early in 2016. Outside London, Stagecoach UK and Lothian buses are now members too.

== Operation ==
CIRAS provides a reporting process for UK and ROI transport workers to report incidents or concerns about rules and procedures, facilities, equipment, or training and briefing. Reports can be raised via telephone call, freepost, or via web enquiry form. Regardless of the way in which a report was raised, a reporting analyst will always interview the reporter and ensure that the final report does not contain any information that might identify him or her. These reports are sent to the responsible company for review, action, and response. The original reporter receives a written copy of the response provided by the company. It is worth noting that the responding company does not have to be the one the reporter works for (for example, a train driver might receive a response from Network Rail if the original report was about the infrastructure). Selected reports are also published in the quarterly CIRAS newsletter Frontline Matters which can be found on the website: www.ciras.org.uk.

== Significance ==
CIRAS is recognized as creating one of the safety industries taxonomies to classify human error and accidents. It is an example of a reporting system which collects reports, including "near-misses", as a means of prevention instead of reporting only adverse outcomes. Around 70 per cent of reports lead to some form of positive action - this is quite remarkable given that around two-thirds of all CIRAS reports have been reported internally before ending up at CIRAS after an 'unsatisfactory' response has been obtained.

== See also ==
- Railways Act
- Railways and Transport Safety Act 2003
- Department for Transport
- Rail Safety and Standards Board
- Rail Accident Investigation Branch
- Aviation Safety Reporting System (ASRS)

== Sources ==
- Ladbroke Grove rail crash Report Part I
- RSSB - CIRAS Information
