= Pam Warren (speaker) =

British rail crash survivor, author (born 1967)

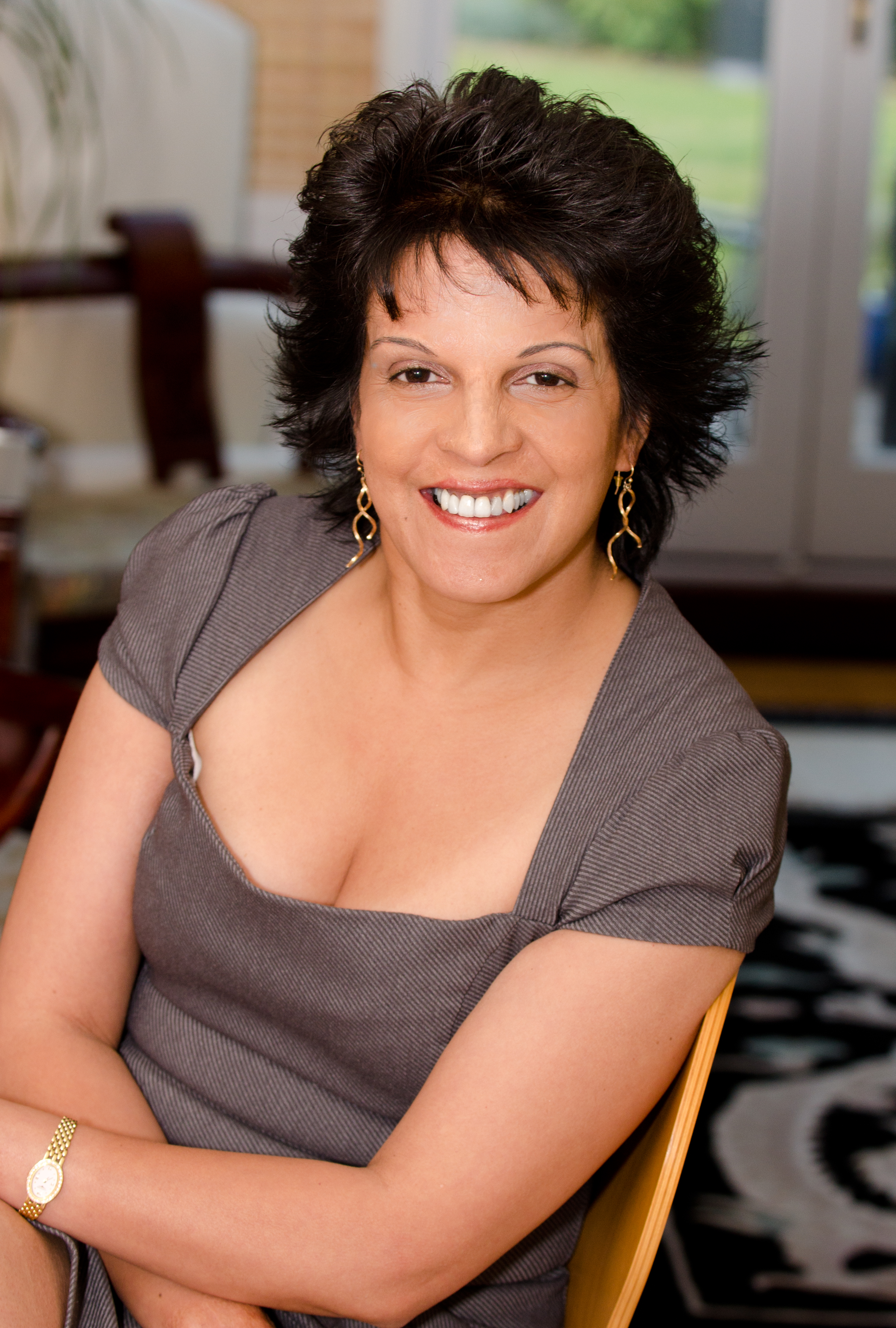
- Born: 16 February 1967 (age 59)
- Occupations: Writer, motivational speaker
- Known for: Ladbroke Grove rail crash survivor

Pam Warren (born 16 February 1967) is a professional speaker and author who became known in the United Kingdom as the 'Lady in the Mask' after receiving severe burn injuries in the Ladbroke Grove rail crash in 1999. She is the founder of the Paddington Survivors Group. She is a spokesperson and advocate for railway safety and the author of From Behind the Mask, a memoir of her life during and after the train collision.

On 5 October 1999, the Ladbroke Grove rail crash occurred; thirty-one people died in the crash; Warren was among 419 injured passengers. Her injuries were so severe she was not expected to survive. She was in a coma for three weeks and skin grafts were added to her leg, hands and face. She suffered full thickness burns to these areas and underwent numerous operations by plastic surgeons. To minimise scarring, her doctors prescribed a clear perspex mask that she wore over her face 23 hours a day for 18 months. Dubbed by the media as 'The Lady in the Mask' this spurred the title of her book, From Behind the Mask. She was in the hospital for close to three months. Warren underwent years of reconstructive surgery including over 23 operations and was diagnosed in 2001 with post traumatic stress disorder.

Warren became an ambassador for The Scar Free Foundation Charity based in London, a charity whose goal is to heal any wound without leaving a scar. She also represents and works with the Children's Burns Research Centre in the South West of England and the Sue Ryder Hospice in Nettlebed.
