= Cab Secure Radio =

British Rail driver/signaller communication system

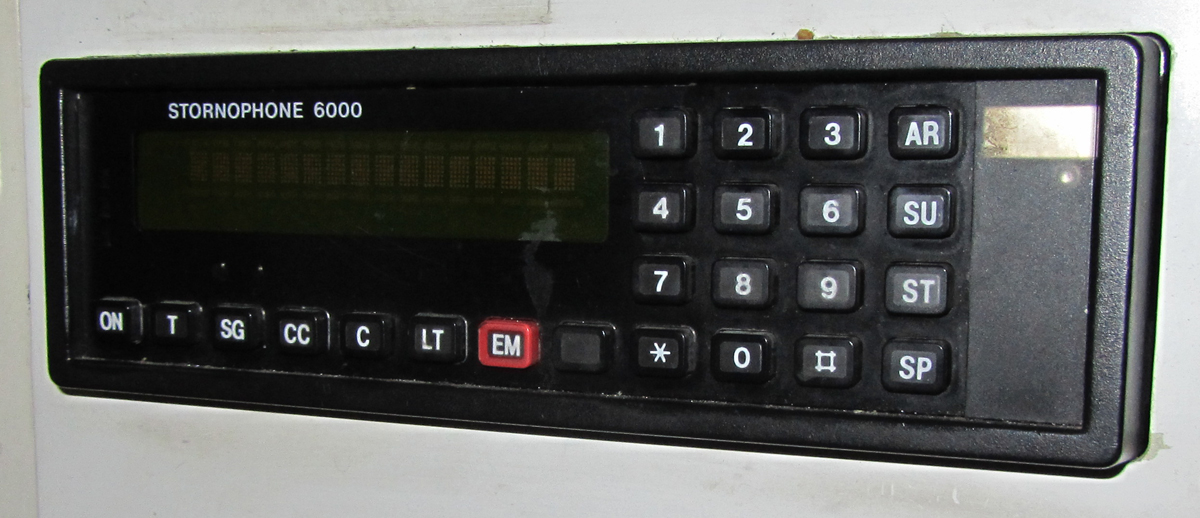
Stornophone 6000 Cab Secure Radio

Cab Secure Radio (CSR) was an in-cab analogue radiotelephone system formerly used on parts of the British railway network. Its main function was to provide a secure speech link between the train driver and the signaller which could not be overheard by other train drivers. In areas where CSR was used, it had to be the primary method of communication between driver and signaller, always being used in preference to the signal post telephone. CSR was replaced by the GSM-R digital system, forming the initial phase of rollout of ERTMS throughout the UK.

== History ==
CSR was first introduced in the Glasgow area in 1986 to enable driver-only operation of trains. It was later used in the London and Liverpool areas.

In the Railway rule book, there is provision for a driver stopped at a red signal to disembark the train and access a track-side telephone in order to talk to the signaller. This might be occasioned by a scenario where there was a track circuit failure and the signals had reverted to the safe condition. The rule book however also requires the train to be continuously manned during normal running operations. CSR was first introduced to allow the driver to talk to the signaller without leaving the train. The safety features associated with CSR whereby a signaller can send an alarm to a train or order a train to stop using a single data transmission service later secured CSR as a safety facility that could be deployed on a more universal basis. However it wasn't until the Clapham Rail disaster and subsequent Hidden report also followed by the accident at Cowden where the real value of the facility was learned.

== Functions ==
- Signaller can call and speak to driver.
- Driver can call and speak to signaller.
- Signaller and driver can exchange preset text messages.
- Signaller can send emergency stop messages to a particular train, or all trains in an area.
- Driver can make an emergency call to signaller.
- Signaller can speak to passengers via the train's public address system.
- Signaller can connect driver to the railway telephone network.
- Signaller notified if DSD is released after a DSD alarm displays for 30 seconds on the radio.

== Use ==
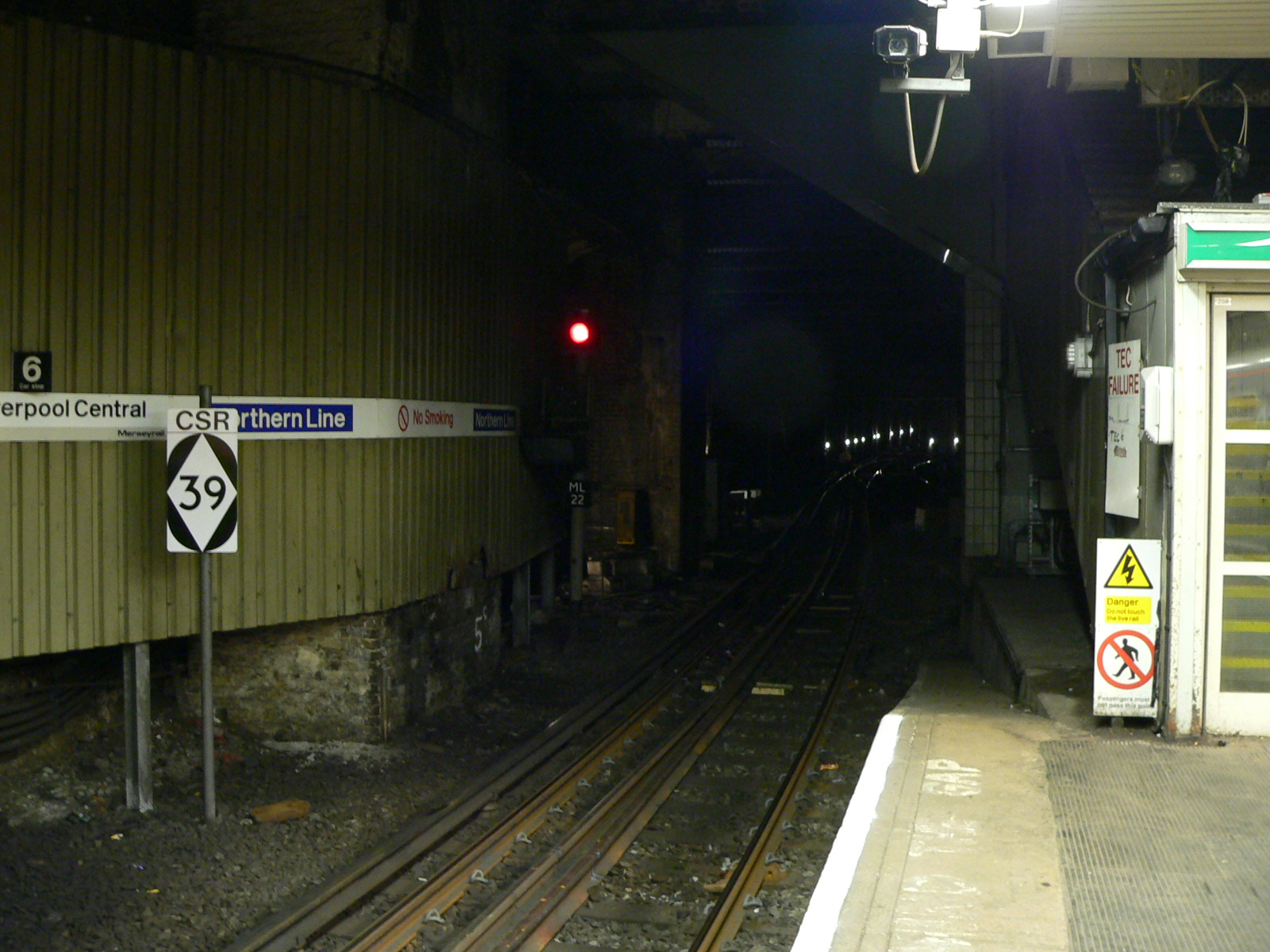
Marker board for the start of CSR area 39 on Merseyrail

The driver initialised the CSR with an area code followed by the identification number of the signal in front of the train. The radio then automatically sent the stock number of the train (e.g., 455112), to the signalling system. The signaller then allocated a train reporting number (e.g., 2M34) to the train. This reporting number was used by the signalling equipment to track the progress of the train as it moves through the rail network.

Each signalling area (or signal panel within a larger signalbox) used a different radio channel corresponding with an area code. As the train passed from the jurisdiction of one signaller to another, the CSR in the driver's cab changed channel automatically. Lineside signs were provided to inform the driver of where the area code changes. Occasionally the radio failed to change channel or lost the signal completely, in which case the driver could enter the code manually. Lineside signs indicated the change of the CSR radio channel area.

== Hardware ==
CSR cab equipment was either the Stornophone 6000 or a Siemens model.

Driving cabs were equipped with a radio unit, telephone handset and loudspeaker.

The signaller was provided with a visual display unit, specialized keyboard with unique function keys, telephone handset and loudspeaker.

== See also ==
- GSM-R - Successor system
- RETB
- ERTMS
- British Rail Telecommunications
