= Rail Delivery Group =

British railway industry umbrella body

Rail Delivery Group Limited
- Industry: Rail transport
- Predecessor: Association of Train Operating Companies, Rail Delivery Group
- Founded: 10 August 2012; 13 years ago
- Headquarters: London, England, UK
- Key people: Jacqueline Starr (Chief Executive)
- Website: www.raildeliverygroup.com

The Rail Delivery Group Limited (RDG), previously the Association of Train Operating Companies (ATOC), is the British rail industry membership body that brings together passenger and freight rail companies, Network Rail and High Speed 2. The RDG is approximately half-funded by Network Rail, the remainder of its funding being provided by the various transport groups it represents.

The current incarnation of the RDG was created in 2017 from the merger of ATOC and a preceding organisation with the same brand. It performs industry-wide communications, defines ticket validity, participates in the formulation of railway policy, and is responsible for the National Rail Enquiries service. The RDG operates several brands and services, including Interrail and National Rail. Since its creation, it has undertaken several initiatives, such as the opening-up of automatic ticket gates and ticket machines to competition, and the incorporation of new anti-fare evasion technologies at stations. During 2023, the RDG announced the planned closure of many staffed ticket booths across the network; later that same year, the plan was officially abandoned in the face of public opposition.

== History ==
The current RDG has its roots in two preceding organisations, the Association of Train Operating Companies (ATOC), and the Rail Delivery Group. The original Rail Delivery Group was established in 2011 to formulate policy and undertake communications on behalf of the entire railway industry, its membership having comprised all passenger and freight operators in the UK. ATOC was a representative organisation for the various passenger train operating companies operating in Britain; it was established in the wake of the privatisation of British Rail by the train operators for the purpose of ensuring the continuation of various nationwide services, such as ticket acceptance and railcard schemes. ATOC also lobbied on the operators' behalf on various matters.

On 24 October 2017, ATOC and the original RDG were merged to form the Rail Delivery Group. The new organisation is owned by its members, which comprise Network Rail, the nationalised owner of Britain's rail infrastructure; the various train operating companies that provide passenger services; the freight operating companies; the Rail Supply Group (RSG) that represents suppliers to the industry; and HS2 Ltd, the company building a high-speed line. While the RDG name was publicly adopted following the merger, the company's legal name has continued to be ATOC Limited.

In May 2022, the policy and advocacy functions of the Rail Delivery Group on behalf of private sector rail operators, as well as its Engineering and Operations councils, were transferred to a new trade body, Rail Partners. This was to prepare RDG for absorption into Great British Railways as part of the industry reforms set out in the 2021 white paper of the then Conservative government, the Williams-Shapps Plan for Rail. Under that plan, Great British Railways would still contract private rail contractors but as part of a unified concession model that would bring track and train together, in an attempt to get the best of both the public and private sectors in rail operations.

Following the 2024 United Kingdom General Election, the newly elected Labour government stated its intention to re-nationalise the railway and absorb RDG into the new publicly owned structures. As a consequence, Rail Partners was wound up in March 2025.

== Operations and responsibilities ==
The RDG describes its primary purpose as enabling train operating companies and Network Rail to deliver better services for end customers. It performs various key roles in the operation of Britain's railways. Amongst these are defining the validity of tickets, producing the definitive National Routeing Guide, and contributing to the National Fares Manual, which is distributed by the National Rail website. The organisation is responsible for the allocation and settlement of revenue through ORCATS systems. It also handles the licensing (accreditation) of third party ticket sellers, such as travel agents and online sellers (such as Trainline and Red Spotted Hanky).

RDG also performs industry-wide communications with the public, and is responsible for the National Rail Enquiries service. Between 1997 and 2004, the outsourcing specialist Serco was subcontracted to operate the National Rail Enquiry Service by ATOC. The RDG's public relations activities include the sponsorship of various schemes, such as PlusBus, PlusBike, and Bike and Go, as well as staff travel arrangements for both current and retired railway employees.

RDG owns both the National Rail and 'Britain Runs on Rail' brands. Furthermore, it is responsible for several international products, such as 'Britrail' and Interrail. The marketing of the Railcard scheme also comes within the organisation's scope.

The RDG is partially responsible for railway policy formulation; it works with the Rail Supply Group and other parties to coordinate shared objectives. It also has a relationship with various regional and municipal transport authorities, such as Transport for London.

== Initiatives ==
An early pledge made by RDG was the simplification of the British railway ticketing system. During the summer of 2018, it announced measures in line with this objective, including the renaming of half a million tickets, the adoption of simpler language, and a redesign of ticket machines. The RDG has worked closely with the Community Rail Network to support local organisations active on their railway lines and station facilities; this initiative was claimed to have boosted the accessibility of railway services.

Since its launch, the RDG has supported Rail to Refuge, a joint initiative between several passenger train operators and Women's Aid (an English charity), which provides free train travel within Britain for women, men and children travelling to escape domestic abuse. In response to the 2022 Russian invasion of Ukraine, the RDG quickly led a scheme to provide free rail travel to Ukrainian refugees fleeing the conflict.

The management of station-based automatic ticket gates and ticket machines across the majority of British railway stations has been a particularly active area for the RDG. Throughout the 2010s, in coordination with the Office of Road and Rail, the organisation worked to open the supply and operation of this equipment to greater market competition. Upgrades to these barriers have also been carried out, including the use of new technology for catching fare evaders; in 2023, the organisation estimated that roughly £240 million in lost revenue was being incurred through fare evasion across Britain's railways annually.

The RDG worked with the Department for Transport and other entities to support the rollout of contactless payment methods in the South East of England by the end of 2023. In November 2023, the organisation invited suppliers to present proposals for a nationwide contactless ticketing system.

In July 2023, RDG announced proposals for the closure of many ticket offices across the network. Several organisations spoke out against this change; Disability Rights UK raised concerns, stating: "The outcome will reduce confidence in the whole railway system and end the ability for far too many Disabled people to travel by rail at all." Negative opinions on public safety and security were also voiced. In October 2023, the planned closures were abandoned in the face of opposition from the public and from the National Union of Rail, Maritime and Transport Workers (RMT) trade union, which was taking strike action at the time.

== International counterparts ==
As rail franchising also takes place in other countries, many of these nations have one or more equivalent organisations.

In Germany, the Deutschlandtarifverbund (German Tariff Association) is responsible for railway ticket revenue distribution. Political representation of established companies is carried out by the Association of German Transport Companies (Verband Deutscher Verkehrsunternehmen, VDV), whereas public relations of new entrant TOCs are chiefly dealt with by Mofair e.V.

In Spain the Asociación Española de Empresas Ferroviarias de Viajeros (Spanish Association of Passenger Rail Companies) represents the sector, and aims to contribute to changes and regulatory improvement and support and defend the rail transport mode.

In Sweden, the equivalent organisation is the Branschföreningen Tågoperatörerna (Association of Train Operating Companies).

== Future ==
Under the plans (Bill 325 2024-26) laid out in the current parliament underpinning the creation of Great British Railways (GBR), the Labour government intends to consolidate many of the existing rail industry bodies into the new organisation, with their roles carried out under the GBR banner. One function confirmed to move from RDG to GBR is "back of house" ticketing management functions such as the provision of booking and reservation systems. Otherwise, it is still unclear what is the future of RDG.

== See also ==
- Connecting Communities
- List of companies operating trains in the United Kingdom
