= Nokia Networks =

Multinational data networking and telecommunications equipment company

- Formerly: Nokia Siemens Networks (2007–2013); Nokia Solutions and Networks (2013–2014)
- Type: Subsidiary
- Industry: Telecommunications equipment
- Predecessor: Siemens Communications; Alcatel-Lucent
- Founded: 2007; 19 years ago
- Headquarters: Espoo, Finland
- Area served: Worldwide
- Key people: Justin Hotard (Nokia CEO); Marco Wirén (Nokia CFO)
- Products: Mobile Broadband, consultancy and managed services, multimedia technology
- Number of employees: 150,000 (after ALU merger)
- Parent: Nokia
- Website: networks.nokia.com

Nokia Networks (formerly Nokia Solutions and Networks (NSN) and Nokia Siemens Networks (NSN)) is a Finnish multinational data networking and telecommunications equipment company headquartered in Espoo, Finland, and wholly owned subsidiary of Nokia Corporation. It started as a joint venture between Nokia of Finland and Siemens of Germany known as Nokia Siemens Networks.

The formation of NSN was announced in June 2006, and launched in April 2007. Early on, the firm undertook numerous acquisitions, which it typically used to obtain strategically-beneficial technologies or customer bases, such as the wireless-network equipment of Motorola in 2010. During the early 2010s, NSN opted to reorient its focus towards the mobile broadband equipment market and underwent restructuring, selling its fixed line Broadband Access business to ADTRAN, Inc. and enacting job cuts. The firm became increasingly focused on 5G network apparatus.

In 2013, Nokia acquired 100 percent of NSN via the purchase of all of Siemens' shares in the business for €1.7 billion. In April 2014, the NSN name was phased out in favour of the Nokia Networks branding. By 2015, Nokia Networks had operations in around 120 countries. The firm's headcount reached 150,000 following the €15.6 billion acquisition of Alcatel-Lucent in 2015, which was integrated into Nokia Networks, a series of job losses led to almost one-third reduction in staff numbers by the end of 2024. Throughout the 2020s, Nokia Networks has encountered intense competitive pressure alongside an industry-wide downturn in demand for 5G networking equipment.

== History ==
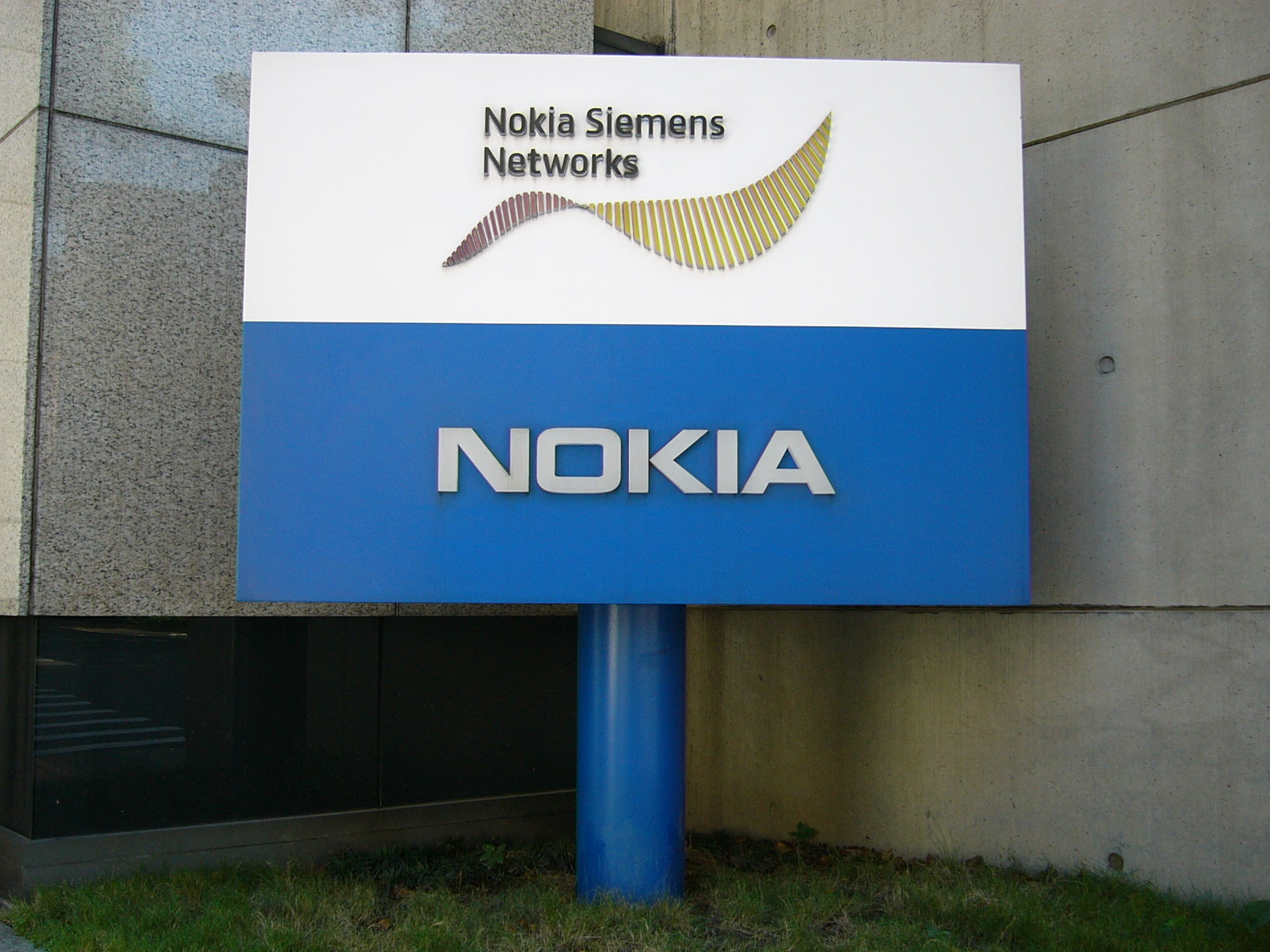
Sign at the Taiwanese headquarters of Nokia Siemens Networks in Songshan District, Taipei.

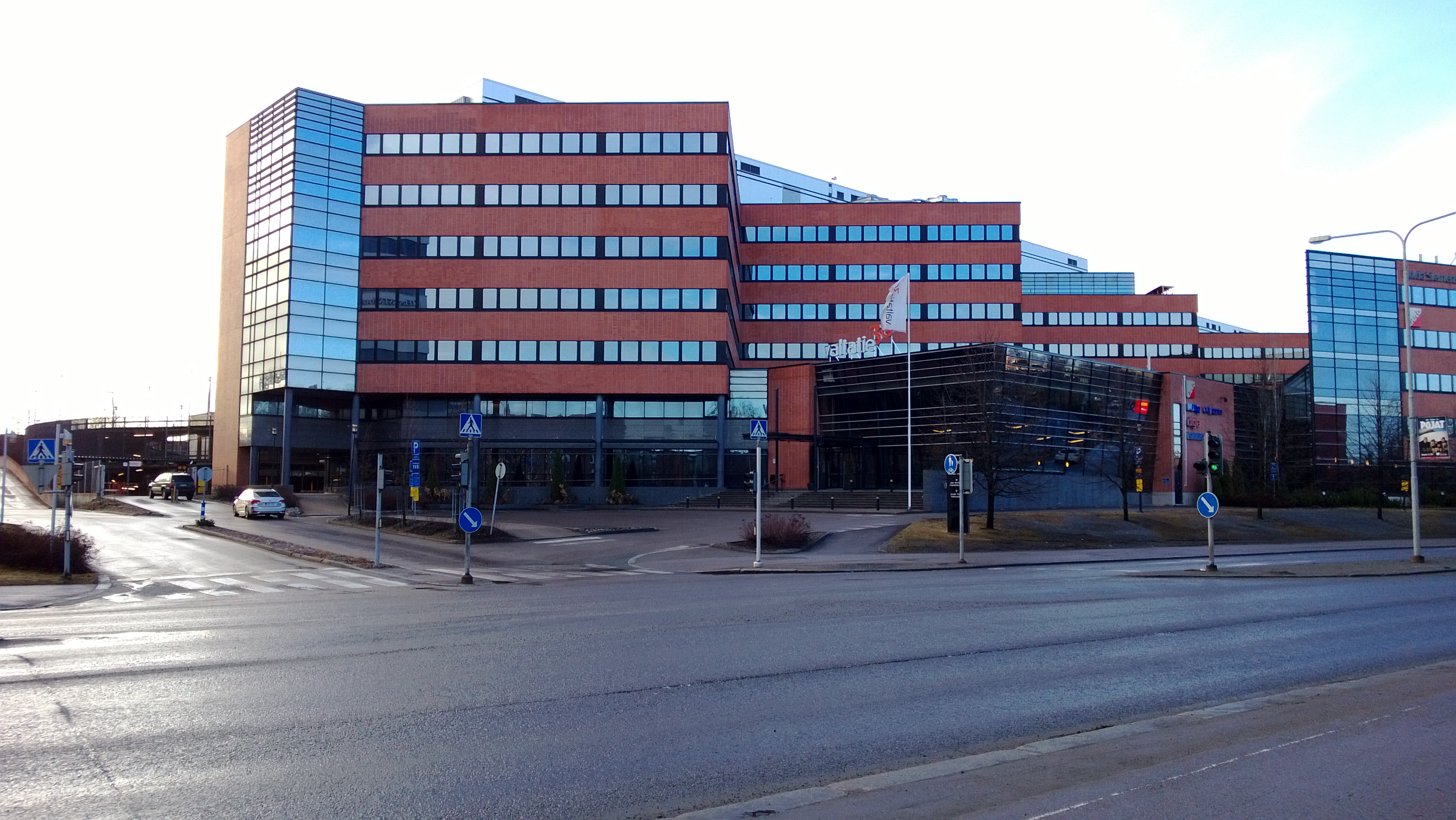
Office building in Tampere, Finland.

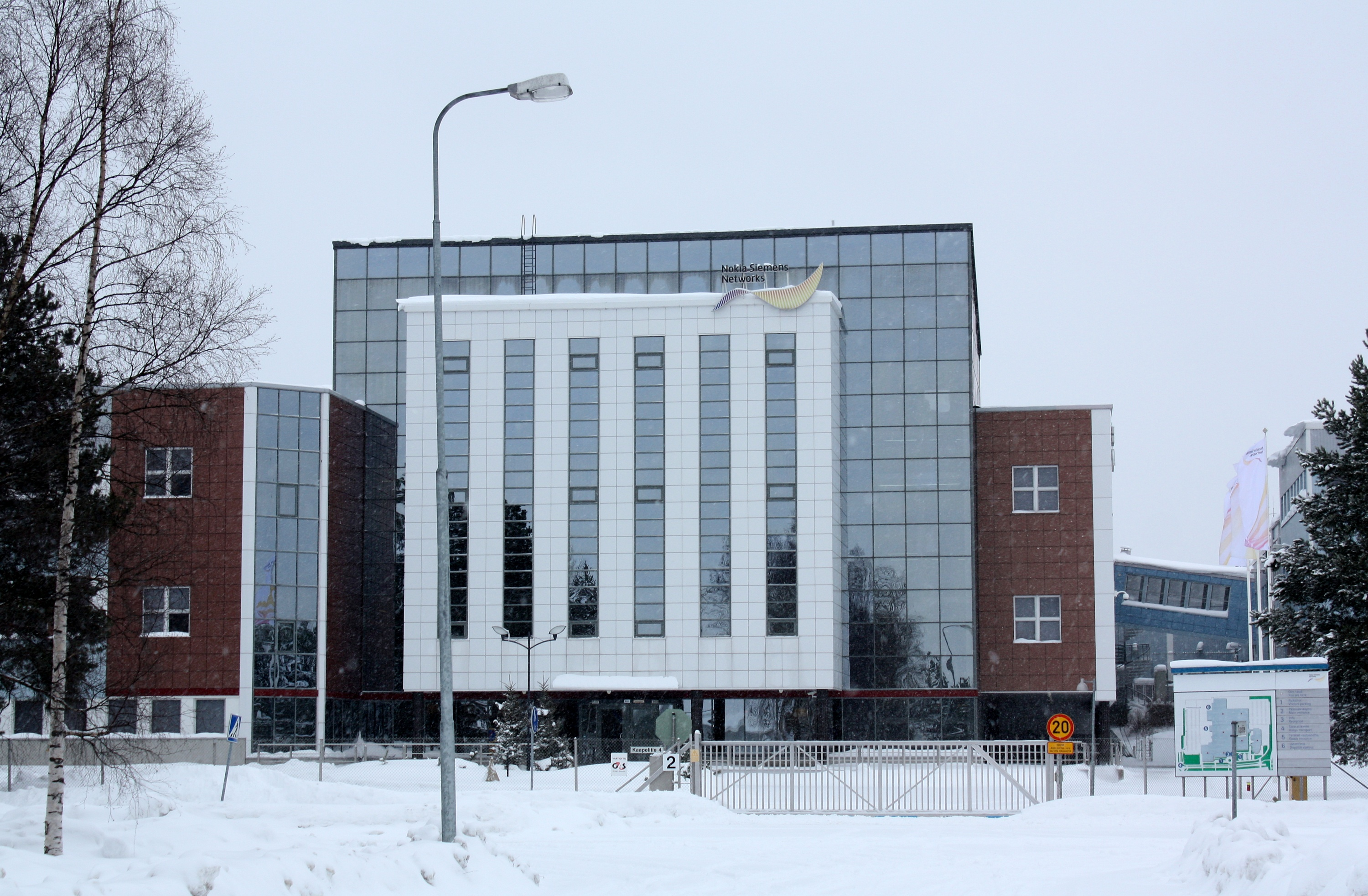
Office building in Oulu, Finland.

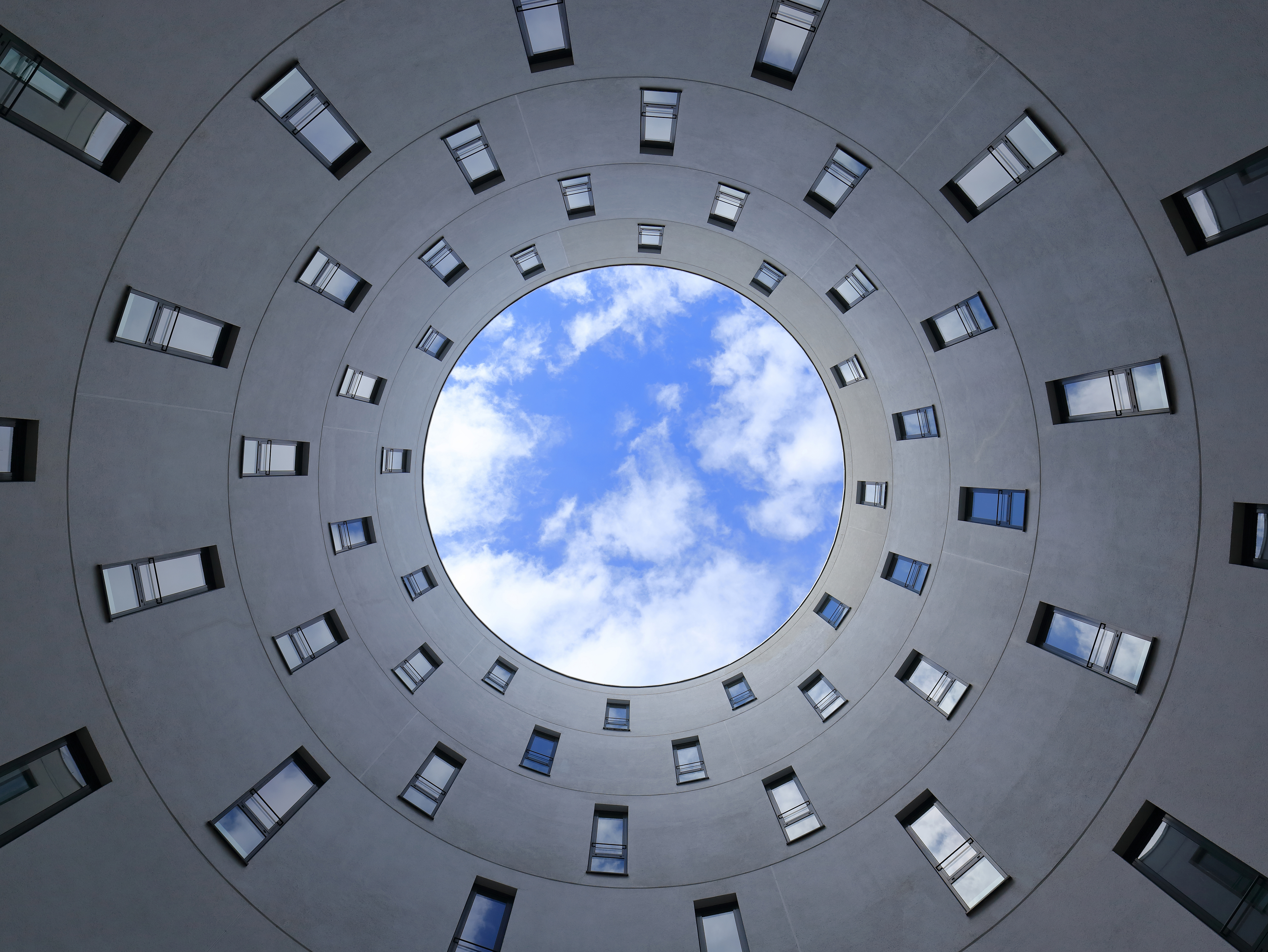
Worm's-eye view of inside the Nokia Networks building in Munich, Germany in 2017

The company was created as the result of a joint venture between Siemens Communications (minus its Enterprise business unit) and Nokia's Network Business. The formation of the company was publicly announced on 19 June 2006. Nokia Siemens Networks (NSN) was officially launched at the 3GSM World Congress in Barcelona in February 2007; and full operations of the company commenced on 1 April 2007. From the onset, NSN had its headquarters in Espoo, Greater Helsinki, Finland.

In January 2008, NSN acquired the Israeli company Atrica, a manufacturer of carrier-class Ethernet transport systems for metro networks; while the full terms of the deal were not publicly disclosed, the price was estimated to have been in the region of $100 million. One month later, the firm also acquired Apertio, a UK-based mobile network customer management tools provider in exchange for €140 million; via this acquisition, NSN gained customers in the subscriber management area, including Orange, T-Mobile, O_{2}, Vodafone, and Hutchison 3G.

During April 2009, Siemens publicly acknowledged that its financial interest in NSN was effectively non-controlling, leaving operational decision-making solely up to Nokia.

On 19 July 2010, NSN announced it would acquire the wireless-network equipment of Motorola. The acquisition was completed on 29 April 2011 for $975 million in cash. As result of the transaction, approximately 6,900 employees located across 52 countries transferred to NSN.

On 23 November 2011, NSN announced that it would refocus its business on mobile broadband equipment, which had been identified as being the fastest-growing segment of the market. In line with this refocus, the company promptly underwent a period of restructuring, during which 17,000 employees were laid off to reduce the company's work force by 23 percent from its 2011 level of 74,000 and achieve a reduction in annual operating expenses by $1.35 billion by the end of 2013.

On 12 December 2011, ADTRAN, Inc. announced it would acquire NSN's fixed line Broadband Access business; this resulted in roughly 400 employees transferring to ADTRAN under the deal.

Shortly after completing the restructuring process, NSN recorded in a positive turn around to its businesses. During early 2013, it was reported that the firm's bottom line and operating margins had risen to approximately 10 percent, favourable in comparison to the previous sub-zero margins recorded, while positive cash flows were also recorded for six continuous quarters. Around this time, the firm reportedly planned to acquire additional finance via the issuing of up to €700 million of high-yield bonds in order to pay down its debts as well as to fund business activities.

On 7 August 2013, Nokia completed the acquisition of Siemens' stake in NSN via a €1.7 billion transaction, resulting in the company becoming a fully owned subsidiary of Nokia. Shortly thereafter, it was rebranded as Nokia Solutions and Networks. On 29 April 2014, Nokia announced that NSN would henceforth be known as Nokia Networks. That same year, Nokia Networks bought the Australian radio filter specialist Mesaplexx for an undisclosed amount; this move was intended to improve its position in the small-cell and “hetnet” market.

On 15 April 2015, Nokia announced its intent to purchase Alcatel-Lucent for €15.6 billion in an all-stock deal. The acquisition aimed to create a stronger competitor to the rival firms Ericsson and Huawei, whom Nokia and Alcatel-Lucent had surpassed in terms of total combined revenue in 2014. After receiving regulatory approval in October 2015 and shareholder approval on 4 January 2016, the acqusition was completed on 3 November 2016, after which Nokia Networks took over the network function of the company.

During April 2018, Poland’s state-owned railway operator PKP Polskie Linie Kolejowe signed a five-year contract with Nokia to deploy a nationwide 13,800km GSM-R network as well as a 11,000km optical fibre backhaul network; it was the firm's largest GSM-related contract at that time. One year later, the German state-owned railway firm Deutsche Bahn awarded a tender for the delivery and testing of the world’s first 5G-based network for automated rail operation to Nokia.

In mid 2020, the firm revealed the existence of its first private 5G standalone product; it was intended for industrial applications, such as mining operations, and had already secured multiple customers at the time of the reveal. That same year, Nokia and Swiss Federal Railways (SBB) completed a proof of concept trial in support of the upcoming Future Railway Mobile Communication System (FRMCS) standard.

By the end of 2024, Nokia's total headcount was 75,600; six years earlier, it reportedly had roughly 103,000 employees. The job losses during this period came in response to various factors, from an industry-wide downturn in demand for 5G networking apparatus to the loss of key contracts to competitors. In September 2020, the North American telecoms operator Verizon announced that it was switching from Nokia Networks, its established supplier of 5G, to the South Korean firm Samsung. Similarly, in December 2023, AT&T awarded a five-year contract, valued as high as $14 billion, to Eriksson instead of Nokia.

During June 2024, Nokia reported its plan to exit the submarine networks market via the sale of its Alcatel Submarine Networks business to the French state in exchange for €350 million, although it would retain a 20 percent stake; this divestment was completed in January 2025.

In January 2025, it was announced that the British telecoms infrastructure firm Openreach had formed an agreement with Nokia Networks for the supply of its One Network Platform, a combination of software and hardware solutions that enables the adoption of an intent-based networking (IBN) model across Openreach's open-access optical fibre network. During November of that year, SoftBank signed an agreement with Nokia to modernise and expand the former's 4G and 5G network infrastructure across Western Japan.

During March 2026, Nokia announced that further job losses would occur that year. That same month, it formed a partnership with Intec Micros to offer the design, deployment and management of networking solutions.

== Logos ==
Nokia Siemens Networks (2007–2013)

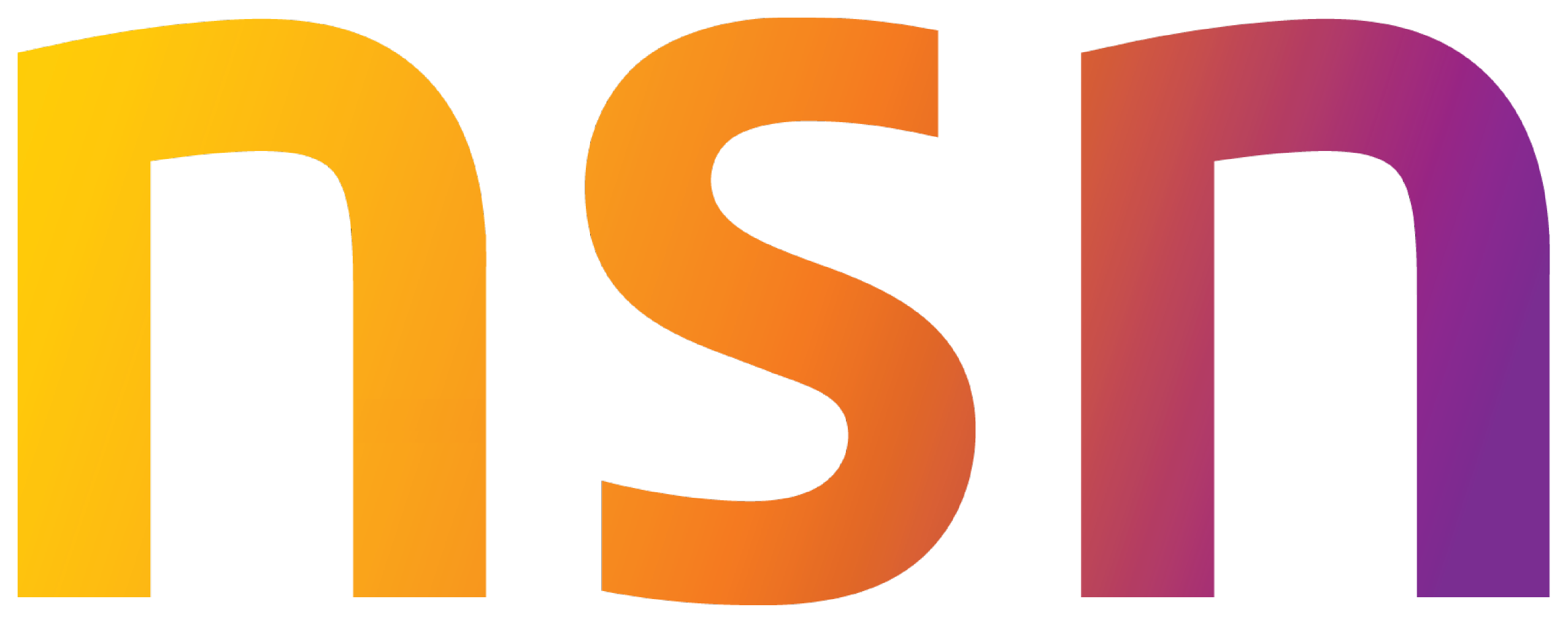
Nokia Solutions and Networks (2013–2014)

Nokia Networks logo (2014–2017)

Nokia logo (1978–2023)

Nokia logo (since 2023)

== See also ==
- List of networking hardware vendors
