= International Union of Railways =

International rail transport industry body

- Union internationale des chemins de fer

- UIC membership: At least one active member At least one affiliate member At least one associate member Suspended members
- Abbreviation: UIC
- Formation: 17 October 1922; 104 years ago
- Legal status: Active
- Purpose: Promote rail transport at world level Meet the challenges of mobility and sustainable development
- Headquarters: 16 Rue Jean Rey; Paris, France
- Members: 223 (2024)
- Chairman: Yuji Fukasawa (JR East)
- Vice chairman: Mohamed Rabie Khlie (ONCF)
- Director general: François Davenne (UIC)
- coordinator: Karine Van Ceunebroeck
- Website: uic.org

The International Union of Railways (French: Union internationale des chemins de fer, UIC) is an international rail transport industry body based in Paris.

== History ==
The railways of Europe had originated during the nineteenth century as many separate concerns across numerous nations; this led to disparate and conflicting standards emerging and thus onto incompatibility. One prominent example was the British Gauge War, during which different railway companies were laying different track gauges across Great Britain, causing inefficiency wherever a break of gauge occurred, prior to an Act of Parliament the issue in 1846 by establishing one standard gauge of 4 ft 8 1/2 in (1,435 mm). The early effort towards standardisation somewhat influenced railways abroad as well, however various other track gauges persisted and developed across the world; even through to the twenty first century, incompatible track gauges, let alone other issues, persisted to hinder interoperability efforts.

Several key events happened during the early twentieth century; in the aftermath of the First World War and the Treaty of Versailles, numerous border changes were enacted across Europe, which greatly impacted several formerly united national railway networks while compelling several others together in some cases. It was early into the interwar period that the UIC was established on 17 October 1922 with the principal aim of standardising practices across the railway industry and expanding international cooperation in the sector.

The UIC has introduced numerous classification systems over the decades. During the 1970s, the UIC Franc currency equivalent was established for the purpose of easing international ticket revenue sharing; it was replaced by the European Currency Unit on 1 January 1990. UIC classification and UIC Country Codes allowed precise determination of rolling stock capabilities and ownership; furthermore, wagons have been assigned their own unique UIC wagon numbers.

Over time, the UIC has formed various partnerships and cooperative frameworks with other multinational railway authorities, such as the European Union Agency for Railways. The UIC has played a leading role in the development of Technical Specifications for Interoperability (TSIs), which have gradually taken over from older standards developed by various national railway entities.

During the 1990s, the GSM-R radio telecommunication system was formulated as an international interoperability specification covering voice and signalling systems for railway communications. GSM-R, which is built on GSM technology, was designed to be a cost efficient digital replacement for various existing incompatible in-track cable and analogue railway radio networks. The specification for GSM-R is maintained via the UIC project European Rail Traffic Management System (ERTMS). By June 2023, GSM-R had been implemented across roughly 130,000km of track, along with 90,000 cab radios and 20,000 datalink radio units.

A more capable next-generation radio, the Future Railway Mobile Communication System (FRMCS) program, is under development as of 2023. In addition to eventually replacing GSM-R, it will provide new capabilities that require more rapid data exchange, such as live video transmission.

== Mission ==
The UIC's mission is "to promote rail transport at world level and meet the challenges of mobility and sustainable development."

== Objectives ==
The UIC's main objectives are to:

- Facilitate the sharing of best practices among members (benchmarking)
- Support members in their efforts to develop new business and new areas of activities
- Propose new ways to improve technical and environmental performance
- Promote interoperability, create new world standards for railways (including common standards with other transport modes)
- Develop centres of competence (High Speed, Safety, Security, e-Business, ...)

== Members ==
When founded in 1922 the UIC had 51 members from 29 countries, including Japan and China. They were soon joined by members from the Soviet Union, the Middle East and North Africa. As of September 2025, the UIC has 223 members (include suspended) across five continents. Of these there are:

There are 62 active members (48 in Europe, 9 in Asia-Pacific, 7 in Middle East and one in Africa):

- Austria ÖBB
- Belgium Infrabel and SNCB
- Bosnia and Herzegovina ŽFBH
- Bulgaria BDZ and NRIC
- China CR and NRA
- Croatia HŽ Infrastruktura
- Czech Republic ČD and SŽ
- Denmark DSB
- Finland FTIA
- France SNCF
- Germany DB
- Greece Hellenic Train and OSE
- Hungary Gysev/Raaberbahn and MÁV
- India Indian Railways
- Iran RAI
- Iraq IRR
- Ireland CIÉ
- Israel Israel Railways
- Italy FS
- Japan JR East
- Kazakhstan KTZ
- South Korea Korail and KNR
- Latvia LDZ
- Lithuanian LTG
- Mongolia UBTZ
- Morocco ONCF
- Netherlands NS and ProRail
- Norway Bane NOR
- Poland PKP
- Portugal CP and IP SA
- Romania CFR Călători, CFR Marfă and CFR SA
- Saudi Arabia SAR
- Serbia IŽS
- Slovakia ŽSR, ZSSK and ZSSK Cargo
- Slovenia SŽ
- Spain Adif and Renfe
- Sweden Green Cargo, SJ and Trafikverket
- Switzerland BLS and SBB CFF FFS
- Syria CFS
- Taiwan THSRC
- Turkey TCDD and TCDDT
- Ukraine UZ
- United Kingdom Eurostar and Network Rail

There are 84 affiliate members (37 in Europe, 24 in Asia-Pacific, six in Africa, five in Middle East, five in Latin America and four in North America):

- Algeria ANESRIF
- Argentina ALAF and JST
- Australia HSRA, NTC, NTRO, TFNSW, Queensland TMR, Victoria DOTP and WA PTA
- Austria BR ICS and Ubimet
- Belgium AERRL and BCC
- Brazil ANPTrilhos and ANTF
- Canada ALTO, RAC and TC
- China BJTU, CARS, CRDC, CRECC, CRRC Siyuan, CRRC SRI, CRRC ZIC, CRSCD, SWJTU and Tongji University
- France Ermewa, Europe Express, Lisea, Région Grand Est, Systra and TELT
- Gabon ARTF
- Germany BSB, Deutschlandtarif and OPTIMA-TOURS
- Hungary ÉKM, Foxrail and KTI Nonprofit Kft
- Iran Isfahan Kafriz
- Italy Italo
- Japan JR RTRI
- Jordan ARC and JHR
- South Korea KRRI
- Latvia RB Rail
- Malaysia RAC
- Mexico ARTF
- Netherlands Eurail and Hitrail
- Norway Entur and Norske Tog
- Philippines DOTr
- Poland IK
- Portugal Medway
- Saudi Arabia GCCRA and TGA
- Senegal CFS and SENTER
- Serbia Eurorail Logistics and ŽS
- South Africa RSR and TUT
- Spain FCH and FFE
- Sweden Jernhusen
- Switzerland Alliance Swisspass
- Thailand DRT and RTRDA
- United Arab EmiratesMOEI
- United Kingdom ATOC, BCRRE, GCRE, Harsco, HS2 Limited, RSSB and Stena Line
- United States AAR and FRA

There are 61 associate members (29 in Europe, 13 in Africa, ten in Asia-Pacific, three in Middle East, three in North America and two in Latin America):

- ARA
- FASE
- SCR
- Sydney Trains
- GKB and WLC
- ADY
- Lineas and THI Factory
- ŽRS
- Bulgarian Railway Company
- SOPAFERB
- Camrail
- Via Rail
- EFE
- SIPF and Sitarail
- HŽ Cargo and HŽPP
- Student Agency
- ENR
- EDR
- Getlink
- Setrag
- GR
- Attica Group
- GYSEV Cargo
- DFCCIL
- Trenord
- JR Central and JR West
- KRC
- CFL and CFL Cargo
- KTM
- SNIM
- ŽPCG
- ZRSM Transport and ZRSM Infrastructure
- Oman Rail
- Pakistan Railways
- PNR
- CTV, GFR and Unicom
- SNCS
- Srbija Kargo and Srbijavoz
- ETS, Euskotren, FGC and LFP
- RHB
- TRC
- TRC
- SNCFT
- Etihad Rail
- NI Railways
- Amtrak and CHSRA
- VNR

There are 16 suspended members:

- Algeria SNTF
- Belarus BCh
- Democratic Republic of Congo ONATRA
- Indonesia Kereta Api Indonesia
- Libya Libya Railroads
- Mongolia MTZ
- Russia FPC, MIIT, NIIAS, RZD, RZDstroy and VNIIZHT
- Senegal GTS
- Sudan SRC
- Syria SHR
- Thailand SRT

On 12 November 2010, the UIC opened an African regional office in Tunis, Tunisia with the support of SNCFT.

On 9 March 2022, the UIC suspended all member companies from Russia and Belarus, following Russian invasion of Ukraine.

== Standard terminology ==
In order to provide a common understanding and reduce potential confusion, the UIC has established standard international railway terminology and a trilingual (English-French-German) thesaurus of terms. The thesaurus was the result of cooperation with the European Conference of Ministers of Transport (ECMT/CEMT) and was published in 1995.

== Classification of railway vehicles ==
The UIC has established systems for the classification of locomotives and their axle arrangements, coaches and goods wagons.

== Some UIC regulations ==
UIC plays an important role in standardization of railway parts, data and terminology, though the degree to which its standards have been adopted by its members varies. Therefore, UIC codes (also known as UIC leaflet) are developed since the beginning of UIC's work. A new term for these UIC leaflets is used by UIC for better understanding: International Railway Solution (IRS).

Some UIC codes are:

- UIC 568 The 13-corded standardized connection cable with connector is used to transmit data and commands between the locomotive and the carriages of a passenger train.
- UIC 592-2 Large containers for transport on wagons – Technical conditions to be fulfilled by large containers accepted for use in international traffic. Describes the classes and categories of large containers, handling characteristics, identification markings, and special conditions applying to large tank containers.
- UIC 592-3 Large containers (CT), swap bodies (CM) and transport frames for horizontal transhipment (CA) – Standard report on acceptance tests.
- UIC 592-4 Swap bodies for grab handling and spreader gripping – Technical conditions. Swap bodies are the removable superstructures of road transport vehicles. Their dimensions and some of their fittings are standardised, particularly dimensions, strength parameters and securing devices, of the road vehicle, the wagon and transhipment arrangements (grab-handling grooves, lower securing parts and, in special cases, upper securing parts).
- UIC 596-5 Transport of road vehicles on wagons – Technical organisation – Conveyance of semi-trailers with P coding or N coding on recess wagons. This leaflet sets out regulations and provisions for semi-trailers with normal road transport characteristics for conveyance on fixed-recess carrier wagons. The provisions are valid for semi-trailers, gantry equipment/industrial trucks with grab handles, recess wagon types 1a and 1b in accordance with UIC Leaflet 571–4.
- UIC 596-6 Conveyance of road vehicles on wagons – Technical organisation – Conditions for coding combined-transport load units and combined-transport lines. The leaflet sets out the coding and organisation of loading units in respect of road vehicles on wagons, designed to ensure compatibility of loading units (LU) with the permissible profile for combined transport lines. The provisions aim to facilitate LU identification to speed-up international traffic movements. They are applicable to semi-trailers, swap bodies, roller units loaded on wagons and bogies in combined transport operations.
- FU-7100 Future Railway Mobile Communication System (FRMCS) User Requirements Specification. Defines a set of technology independent user requirements in the form of individual applications. Each application has been defined to provide or support an identified communications need that is considered necessary for current and future railway operation.

== See also ==
- African Union of Railways, similar organisation focused on Africa
- Association of American Railroads
- Intergovernmental Organisation for International Carriage by Rail
- International Union of Public Transport, (UITP) which covers passenger railways, especially in cities.
- Organization for Cooperation of Railways (OSShD) focused on Eastern Europe and Central Asia
- Community of Metros
