= Siding (rail) =

Type of railway track

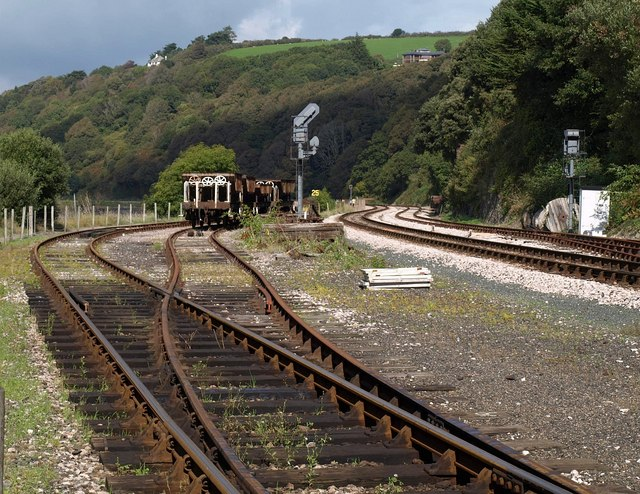
Railway sidings (left) beside the main running-lines (right) at Kingswear in Devon, England

In rail terminology, a siding is a low-speed track section distinct from a running line or through route such as a main line, branch line, or spur. It may connect to through track or to other sidings at either end. Sidings often have lighter rails, meant for lower speed or less heavy traffic, and few, if any, signals. Sidings connected at both ends to a running line are commonly known as loops; those not so connected may be referred to as single-ended or dead-end sidings, or (if short) stubs.

== Functions ==
Sidings may be used for marshalling (classifying), stabling, storing, loading, and unloading rail vehicles.

Common sidings store stationary rolling stock, especially for loading and unloading. Industrial sidings (also known as spurs) go to factories, mines, quarries, wharves, warehouses, some of them are essentially links to industrial railways. Such sidings can sometimes be found at stations for public use; in American usage these are referred to as team tracks (after the use of teams of horses to pull wagons to and from them). Sidings may also hold maintenance of way equipment or other equipment, allowing trains to pass, or store helper engines between runs.

Some sidings have very occasional use, having been built, for example, to service an industry, a railway yard or a stub of a disused railway that has since closed. It is not uncommon for an infrequently-used siding to fall into disrepair. Even if officially abandoned such sidings may be left derelict rather than lifted and removed.

== Passing siding ==
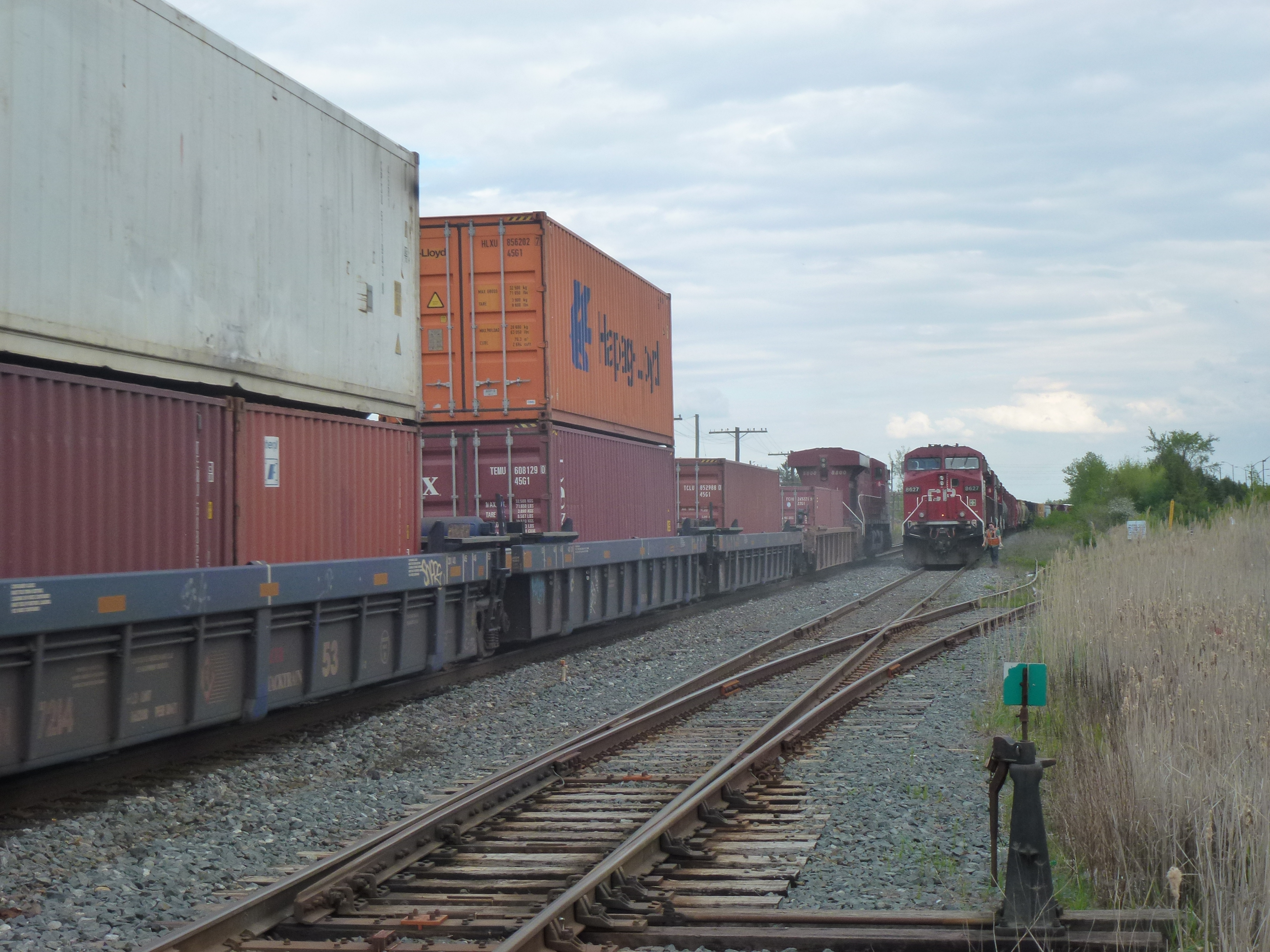
On single-track lines, trains use passing sidings to pass one another. One Canadian Pacific Railway train waits on a siding while a second train passes.

A particular form of siding is the passing siding (U.S. and international) or passing loop (U.K.). This is a section of track parallel to a through line and connected to it at both ends by switches (US) (turnouts in international usage, points in British). Passing sidings allow trains travelling in opposite directions to pass, and for fast, high priority trains to pass slower or lower priority trains going the same direction. Passing sidings are also used to run a locomotive from one end of a train to the other. They are important for efficiency on single track lines, and add to the capacity of other lines.

== Private siding ==
A private siding does not belong to a railway, but to a factory, government department, etc. connected to it. Some larger private sidings have their own locomotive belonging to the owner of the siding. In Australia private sidings must be registered with the safety regulator.

== Refuge siding ==
A refuge siding is a single-ended (or dead-end) siding with a similar purpose to passing loop in that it temporarily holds a train while another one passes.

== Team track ==
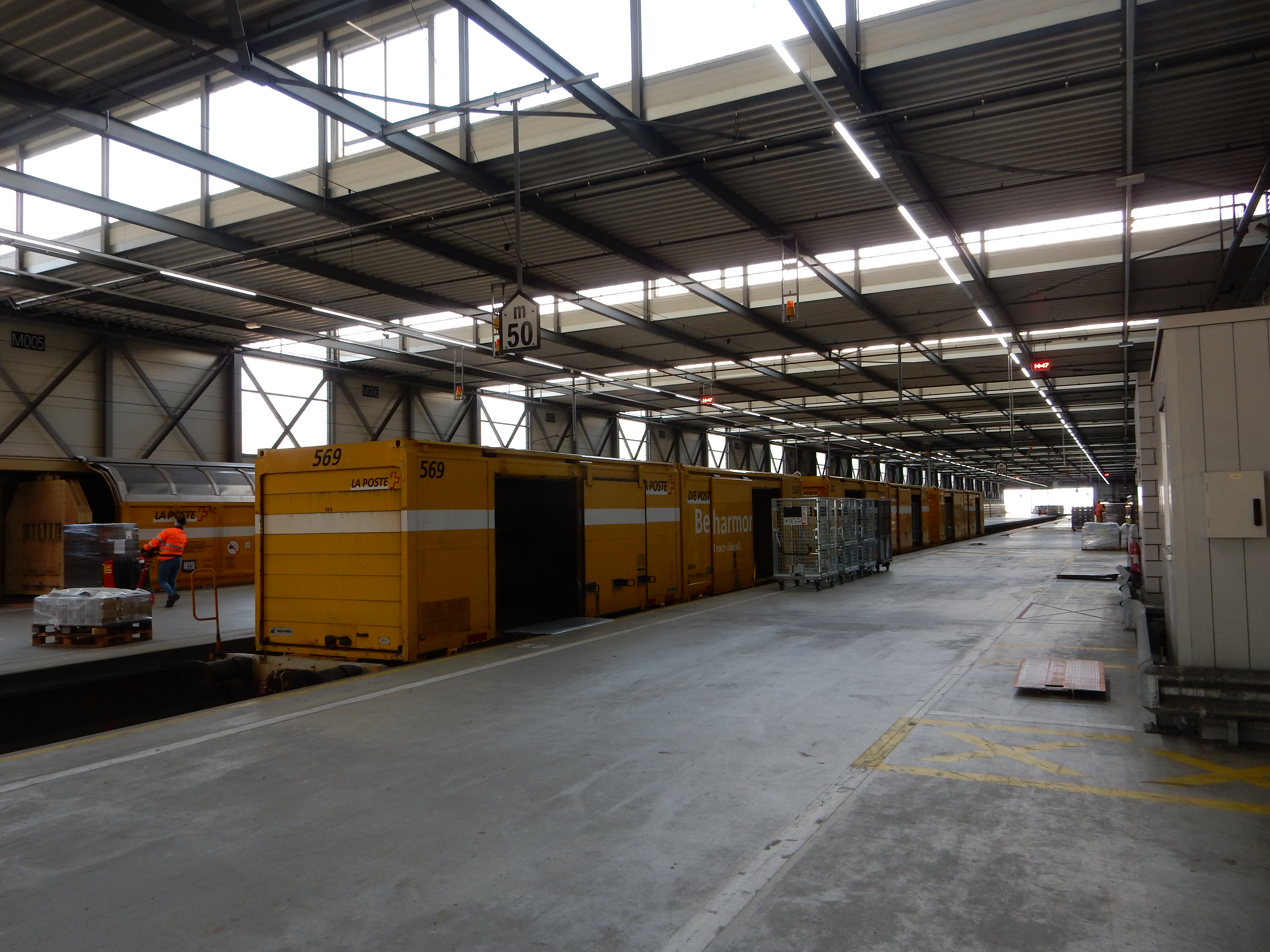
Rail cars parked on sidings in Switzerland

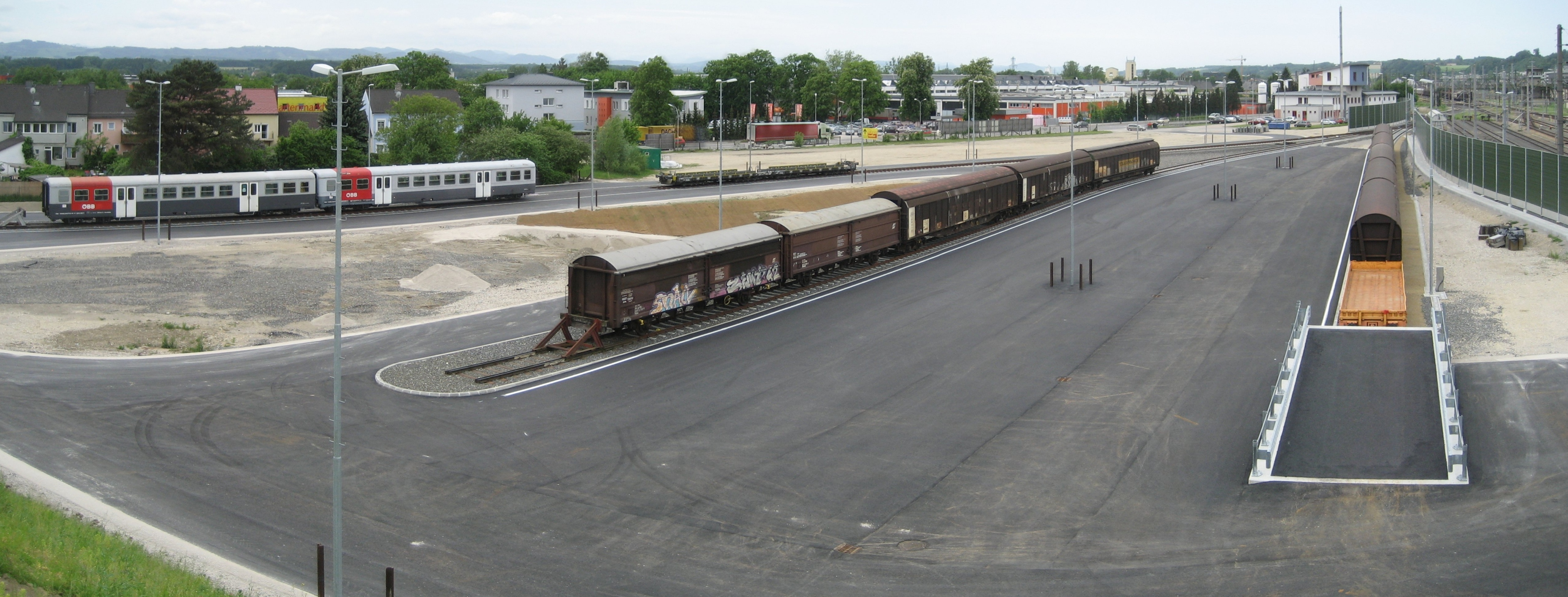
Example of multiple team tracks

A team track is a small siding or spur track intended for the use of area merchants, manufacturers, farmers and other small businesses to personally load and unload products and merchandise, usually in smaller quantities. The term "team" refers to the teams of horses or oxen delivering wagon-loads of freight transferred to or from railway cars. Team tracks may be owned by the railroad company or by customers served by the railroad, or by industrial parks or freight terminals that encompass many customers. In some jurisdictions, the operation and construction of team tracks is regulated by legal authorities.

=== History ===
Earliest rail service to an area often provided a team track on railroad-owned property adjacent to the railroad agent's train station. As rail traffic became more established, large-volume shippers extended privately owned spur tracks into mines, factories, and warehouses. Small-volume shippers and shippers with facilities distant from the rail line continued using team tracks into the early part of the 20th century.

Throughout the mid to latter portion of the 20th century, improved highway systems and abandonment of low-volume rail lines made full-distance truck shipments more practical in North America and avoided delays and damage associated with freight handling during transfer operations. However, as a result of higher fuel costs, greater traffic jams on Interstate Highways, and the growing movement towards sustainable development, there has been recent upward trend towards moving long-distance freight traffic off highways and onto rail lines. This has resulted in local communities and rail lines seeking construction of new team track and intermodal facilities.

=== Design ===
Some railroads publish detailed specifications for the design and construction of many elements of team tracks. For example, the Union Pacific Railroad has standards and guidelines for many aspects of spur track construction including track layout, clearance standards and turnout and switch stand designs.

Generally, team tracks have no road or pedestrian crossings.

== See also ==
- Classification yard (US), known (internationally) as a marshalling yard
- Rail yard

== Bibliography ==
- Jackson, Alan A. (2006). The Railway Dictionary, 4th ed., Sutton Publishing, Stroud. ISBN 0-7509-4218-5.
- Ellis, Iain (2006). Ellis' British Railway Engineering Encyclopaedia. Lulu.com. ISBN 978-1-8472-8643-7.
- Riley, Joseph E. and Strong, James C., "Basic Track", AREMA, 2003
- Solomon, Brian, "Railway Signalling", 1st Edition, Voyageur Press.
