= FQT =

FQT may refer to:

- Final Qualification Tournament, sports term used in:
  - Rugby, at the 2027 Men's Rugby World Cup qualifying
  - Archery, at the 2021 Archery Final Olympic Qualification Tournament
- FQT, Frankfurt Stock Exchange symbol for Frequentis, Austrian information systems company
- FQT Motor, abbreviation for Fujian Qiteng, alternative name for the Keyton brand under the Fujian Motors Group
- FQT, station code for the Kwatrecht railway station, a railway station in Belgium
