= UIC 568 =

Standard cable/connector for transmitting information on railways

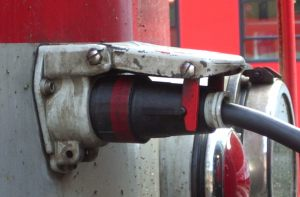

The UIC 568 standard from the International Union of Railways (UIC), describes a 13-conductor cable and connectors used for transmitting a variety of data and commands between a locomotive and passenger carriages. Examples of those commands and data is loudspeaker messages, train destination signs, and control of doors (locked/un-locked, open/close) and others. Since 1996 this standard number has been reused for "Loudspeaker and telephone systems in RIC coaches Standard technical characteristics". The current standard is given in UIC leaflet 558 "Remote control and data cable – Standard technical features for the equipping of RIC coaches".

== History ==
The UIC 568-cable and connector was first introduced along with the specifications for carriages built according to the UIC type Y (24.5 meters long, 8 cabins) and the UIC type X (26.4 meters long, 10 cabins), but have later on been used for variety of other passenger carriages, allowing mixing of InterCity (medium to long distances) and regional (short to medium distances) carriages.

== Remote operation of locomotive ==
Very early in the development of the standard, it was decided that two conductors and pins should be reserved for remote operation of the locomotive (when using control cars).

Locomotives equipped according to this standard will usually have two sockets at each end of the locomotive, and carriages will usually also have one or two sockets. Loose cables are then used to establish connection between the locomotive and the carriages, as well as from carriage to carriage.

== Train communication network ==
Attempts have been made to use this cable for a complete communications bus (Train Communication Network, TCN) but it was decided that backwards compatibility was important, so that un-converted carriages could still be used. This would require an 18-conductor cable, which led to the development of the UIC 558-cable and connectors. 13-wire plugs can be connected to an 18-pin socket, and the signals from the 13-wire cable carried through. The remaining five wires are used for the Train Communication Network (TCN)-bus and side-sensitive door control.

== Head end power ==
Along with the UIC 568-cable and connectors, carriages used for international traffic are required to be equipped with electric heating. The power for this, as well as for lighting, air-conditioning, electric outlets for passengers, etc., is carried by a separate cable. This cable carries single-phase electric power at 1500 volts AC, 50 Hz (with the tracks as the ground connection), supplied from the locomotive, or in some cases a carriage with a generator. In order to use this power, each carriage is equipped with a transformer, which reduces the voltage and supplies a number of electric groups (typically one for heating/air-conditioning, one for lighting, one for outlets to passengers and so on).
