= GSM-R =

Wireless standard for railway communication

GSM-R, Global System for Mobile Communications – Railway or GSM-Railway is an international Wireless communications standard for railway communication and applications.

A sub-system of European Rail Traffic Management System (ERTMS), it is used for communication between train and railway regulation control centers. The system is based on GSM and EIRENE – MORANE specifications which guarantee performance at speeds up to 500 km/h (310 mph), without any communication loss.

GSM-R could be supplanted by LTE-R, with the first production implementation being in South Korea. However, LTE is generally considered to be a 4G protocol, and the UIC's Future Railway Mobile Communication System (FRMCS) program is considering moving to a 5G-based standard (specifically 3GPP R15/16, i.e. 5G NR), thus skipping two technological generations.

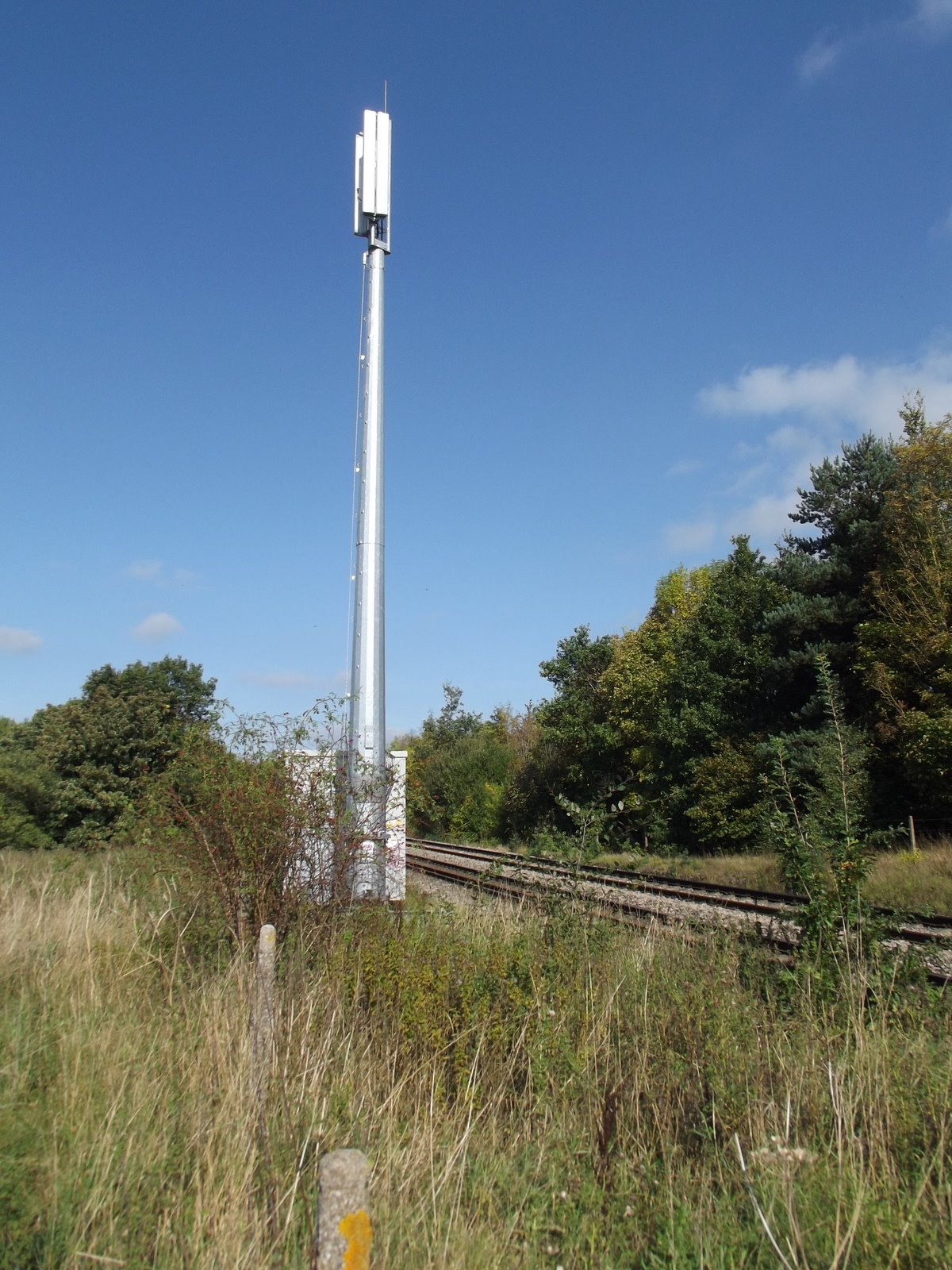
GSM-R mast and cabinet, Abergavenny, Wales

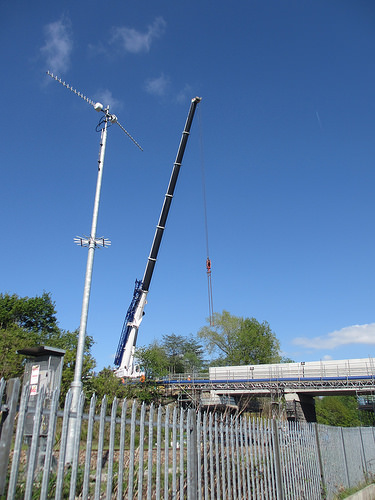
GSM-R Repeater at Dean Clough, Bolton, NW England

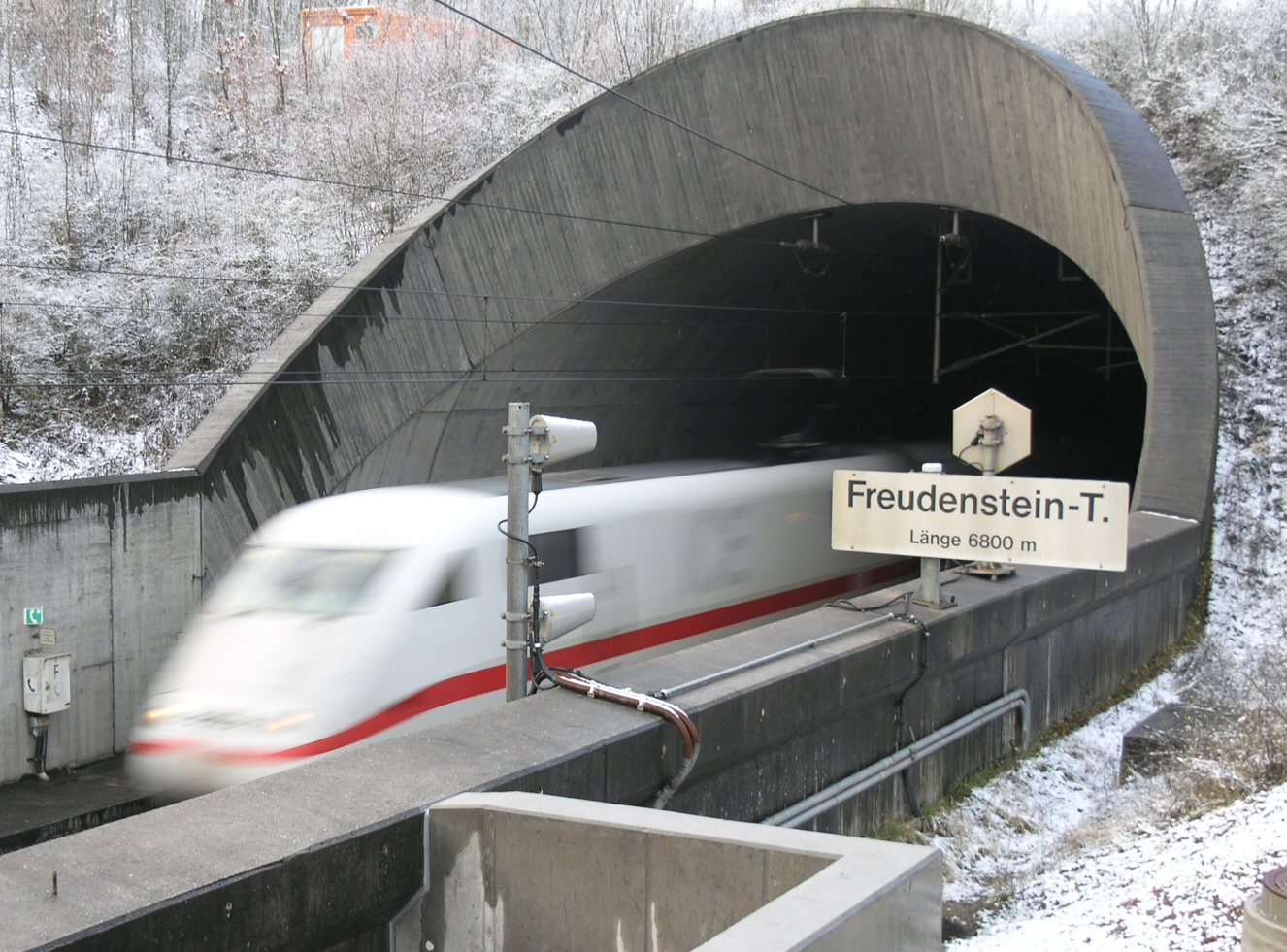
GSM-R directional antennas pointing into the east end of the Freudenstein tunnel, Germany

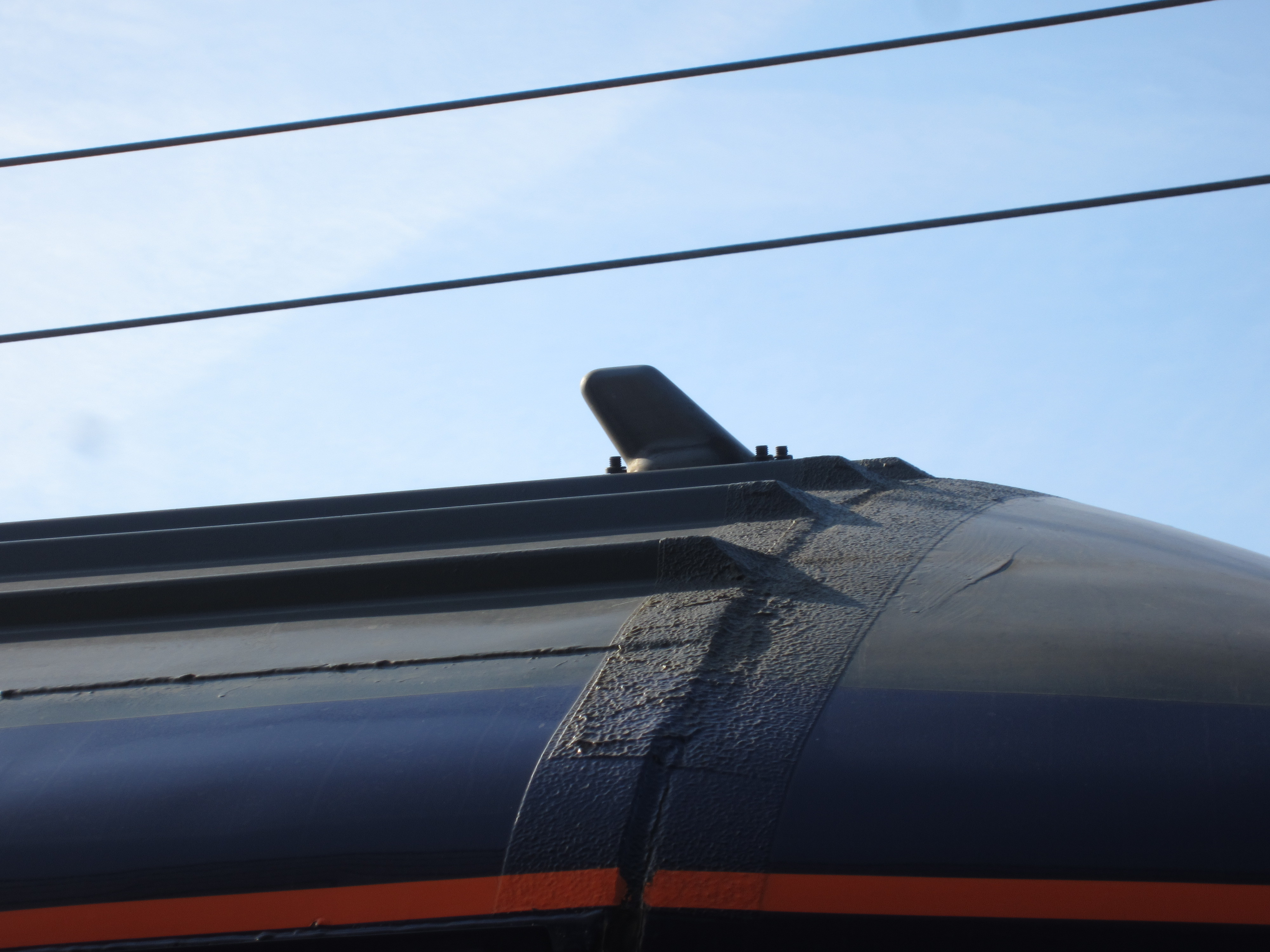
GSM-R 'Shark's-Fin' Mobile Antenna as fitted to a substantial amount of UK rail motive power

== History ==
GSM-R is built on GSM technology, and benefits from the economies of scale of its GSM technology heritage, aiming at being a cost efficient digital replacement for existing incompatible in-track cable and analogue railway radio networks. Over 35 different such systems are reported to exist in Europe alone.

The standard is the result of over ten years of collaboration between the various European railway companies, with the goal of achieving interoperability using a single communication platform. GSM-R is part of the European Rail Traffic Management System (ERTMS) standard and carries the signaling information directly to the train driver, enabling higher train speeds and traffic density with a high level of safety.

The specifications were finalized in 2000, based on the European Union-funded MORANE (Mobile Radio for Railways Networks in Europe) project. The specification is being maintained by the International Union of Railways project ERTMS. GSM-R has been selected by 38 countries across the world, including all member states of the European Union and countries in Asia, Eurasia and northern Africa.

GSM-R is a secure platform for voice and data communication between railway operational staff, including drivers, dispatchers, shunting team members, train engineers, and station controllers. It delivers features such as group calls (VGCS), voice broadcast (VBS), location-based connections, and call pre-emption in case of an emergency. This supports applications such as cargo tracking, video surveillance in trains and at stations, and passenger information services.

GSM-R is typically implemented using dedicated base station masts close to the railway, with tunnel coverage effected using directional antennae or 'leaky' feeder transmission. The distance between the base stations is 7–15 km (4.3–9.3 mi). This creates a high degree of redundancy and higher availability and reliability. In Germany, Italy and France the GSM-R network has between 3,000 and 4,000 base stations. In areas where the European Train Control System (ETCS) Level 2 or 3 is used, the train maintains a circuit switched digital modem connection to the train control center at all times. This modem operates with higher priority than normal users (eMLPP). If the modem connection is lost, the train will automatically stop.

=== Upper system ===
GSM-R is one part of ERTMS (European Rail Traffic Management System) which is composed of:

- ETCS (European Train Control System)
- GSM-R
- ETML (European Traffic Management Layer)
- EOR (European Operating Rules)

== Frequency band ==
GSM-R is standardized to be implemented in either the E-GSM (900 MHz-GSM) or DCS 1800 (1,800 MHz-GSM) frequency band which are used worldwide.

=== Europe ===
Europe includes the CEPT member states, which include all EU members as well as Albania, Andorra, Azerbaijan, Bosnia Herzegovina, Georgia, Iceland, Liechtenstein, North Macedonia, Moldova, Monaco, Montenegro, Norway, San Marino, Serbia, Switzerland, Turkey, Ukraine, the United Kingdom, and Vatican City.

Although previously members of the CEPT, in 2022, Russia and Belarus had their memberships indefinitely suspended in the wake of the Russian invasion of Ukraine.

GSM-R uses a specific frequency band, which can be referred to as the "standard" GSM-R band:

- Uplink: 876–880 MHz used for data transmission
- Downlink: 921–925 MHz used for data reception

In Germany, this band was extended with additional channels in the 873–876 MHz and 918–921 MHz range. Being used formerly for regional trunked radio systems, full use of the new frequencies was planned for 2015.

=== China ===
GSM-R occupies a 4 MHz wide range of the E-GSM band (900 MHz-GSM).

- Uplink: 885–889 MHz
- Downlink: 930–934 MHz

=== India ===
GSM-R occupies a 1.6 MHz wide range of the P-GSM band (900 MHz-GSM) held by Indian Railways:

- Uplink: 907.8–909.4 MHz
- Downlink: 952.8–954.4 MHz

=== Australia ===
GSM-R is being implemented within DCS 1800 band

- Uplink: 1,770–1,785 MHz
- Downlink: 1,865–1,880 MHz

DCS 1800 band was initially divided and auctioned in paired parcels each of 2 × 2.5 MHz with duplex spacing of 95 MHz. State rail operators acquired six mostly non-grouped parcels which cover 2 × 15 MHz of spectrum to deploy GSM-R.

State rail operators re-licensed 2 x 10 MHz of 1800 MHz spectrum in Adelaide, Brisbane, Melbourne, Perth, and Sydney for Rail Safety and Control Communications. All except for South Australian Department of Planning Transport and Infrastructure (Adelaide) re-licensed 2 x 5 MHz of 1800 MHz spectrum at commercial rates set by Australian Government.

=== Technical frequency usage in GSM-R ===
The used modulation is GMSK modulation (Gaussian Minimum-Shift Keying). GSM-R is a TDMA ("Time-Division Multiple Access") system. Data transmission is made of periodical TDMA frames (with a period of 4.615 ms), for each carrier frequency (physical channel). Each TDMA frame is divided in 8 time slots, named logical channels (577 μs long, each time-slot), carrying 148 bits of information.

There are worries that LTE mobile communication will disturb GSM-R, since it has been given a frequency band rather close to GSM-R. This could cause ETCS disturbances, random emergency braking because of lost communications etc.

As a result, there is an increasing trend towards monitoring and managing GSM-R interference using active and automated testing on board trains and trackside.

=== Current GSM-R version ===
The GSM-R standard specification is divided in two EIRENE specifications:

- Functional Requirement Specification (FRS): the definition of higher lever functional requirements
- System Requirement Specification (SRS): the definition of the technical solutions supporting the functional requirements

EIRENE defines the "Technical Specification for Interoperability" (TSI) as the set of mandatory specifications to be fulfilled to keep compatibility with other European networks; current TSI are FRS 7 and SRS 15. EIRENE also defines non-mandatory specifications, that are called "Interim version", which defines extra features that are likely to become mandatory in the next TSIs. The current versions are 21 December 2015 versions FRS 8.0.0 and SRS 16.0.0 The GSM-R specifications are fairly stable; the latest mandatory upgrade was in 2006. The complete timeline of GSM-R versions is:

- December 2000: FRS 5/SRS 13, first version to be widely installed
- October 2003: FRS 6/SRS 14
- May 2006: FRS 7/SRS 15, current TSI
- June 2010: FRS7.1/SRS 15.1, current Interim version; the main added features over TSI are shunting radio and ETCS data only radio

The current version of GSM-R can run on both R99 and R4 3GPP networks.

== GSM-R uses ==
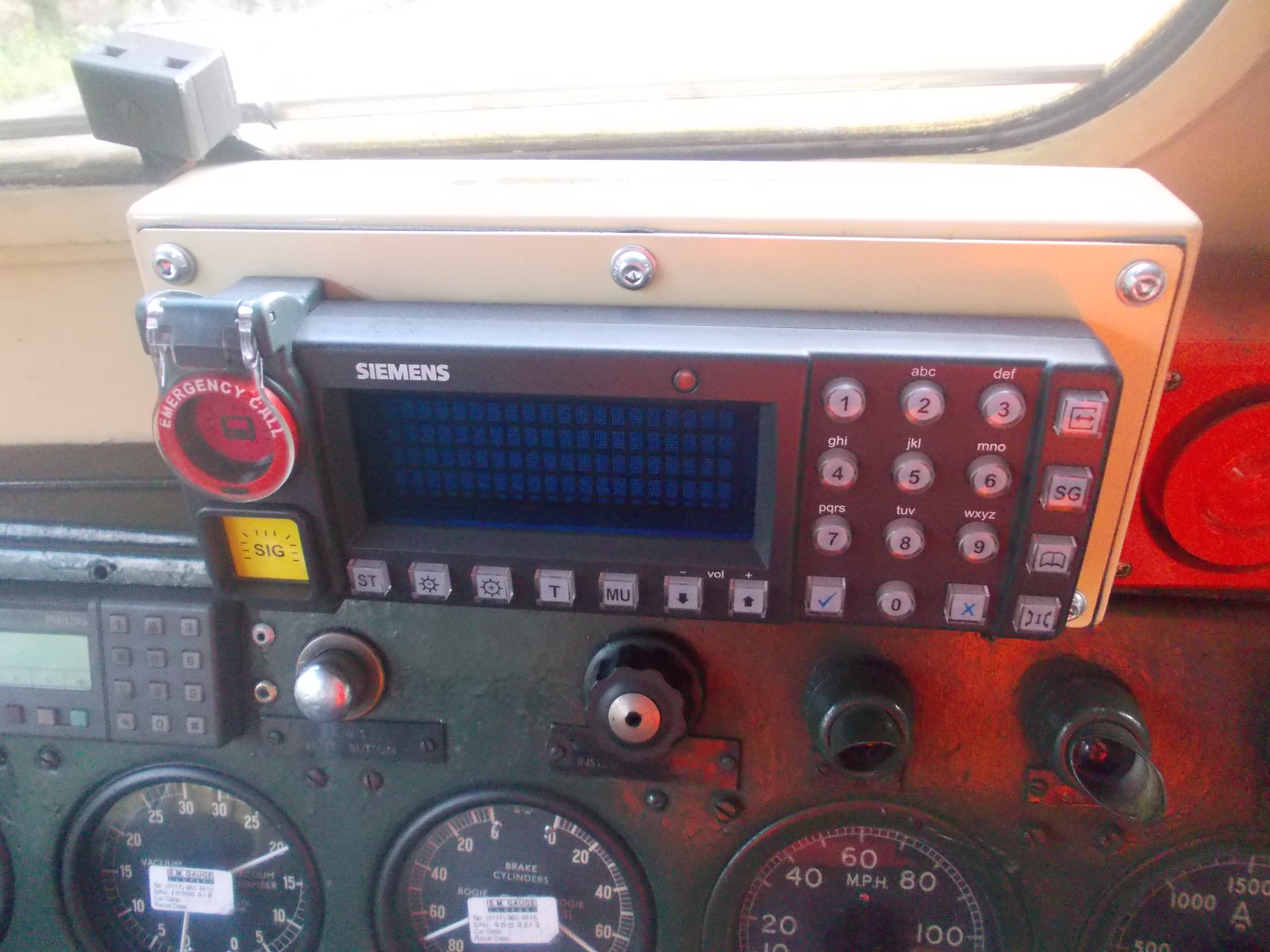
Cab mounted GSM-R radio panel

GSM-R permits new services and applications for mobile communications in several domains:

- Transmission of Long Line Public Address (LLPA) announcements to remote stations down the line
- Control and protection (Automatic Train Control/ETCS) and ERTMS
- Communication between train driver and regulation center
- Communication of on-board working people
- Information sending for ETCS
- Communication between train stations, classification yard and rail tracks

It is used to transmit data between trains and railway regulation centers with level 2 and 3 of ETCS. When the train passes over a Eurobalise, it transmits its new position and its speed, then it receives back agreement (or disagreement) to enter the next track and its new maximum speed.

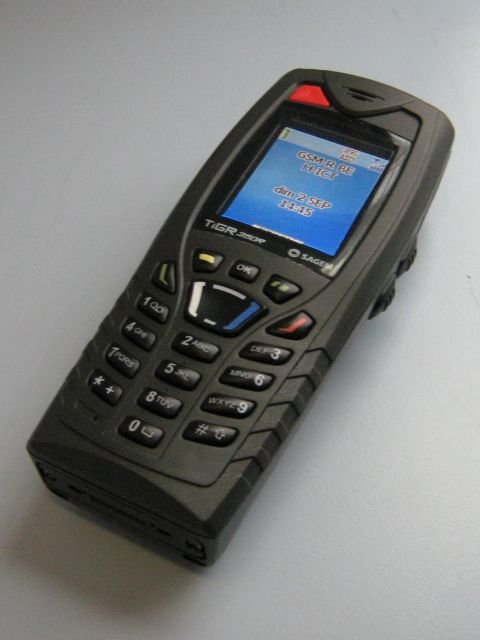
A GSM-R mobile phone used by the National Railway Company of Belgium

Like other GSM devices, GSM-R equipment can transmit data and voice. New GSM-R features for mobile communication are based on GSM, and are specified by EIRENE project. Call features are:

- PtP Call: Point-to-Point Call, the same type of call as a normal GSM call
- VGCS: Voice Group Call System, quite similar to walkie-talkie communication but with a single uplink handled by the network (only one person can speak at a time)
- VBS: Voice Broadcast System, like a VGCS but only the call initiator can speak (the other are only listeners)
- REC: Railways Emergency Call, is a special VGCS defined as 299 with the highest priority possible (0)
- SEC: Shunting Emergency Call, is a special VGCS defined as 599 with the highest priority possible (0)
- Priority control of all the different calls (PtP, VGCS, VBSm, REC and SEC calls)

There are other additional features:

- Functional Addressing, alias system to call someone registered on the GSM-R network, only by knowing the temporary function user (engine driver of train such-and-such, ...)
- Location Dependent Addressing, routing system to call the most appropriate train controller regarding the current train position by dialling a pre-defined short code
- Shunting mode, when users work on the tracks.

== GSM-R features ==
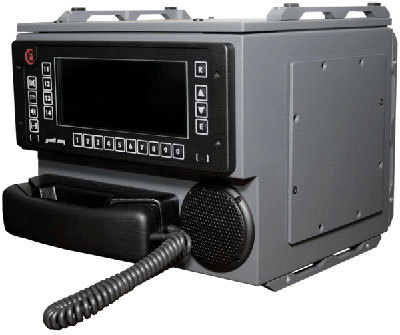
Portable GSM-R Cab Radio system

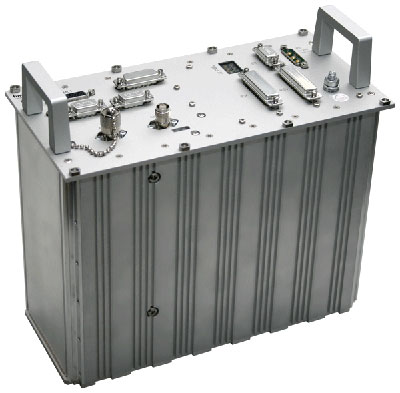
Compact GSM-R Cab Radio

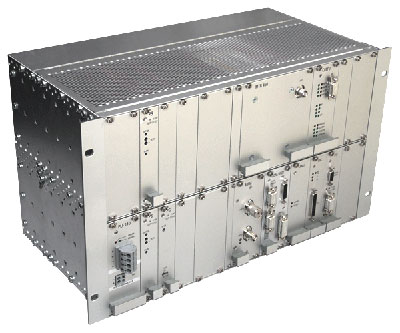
Dual Mode Cab Radio (GSM-R and UIC 751–3) as 19“ rack

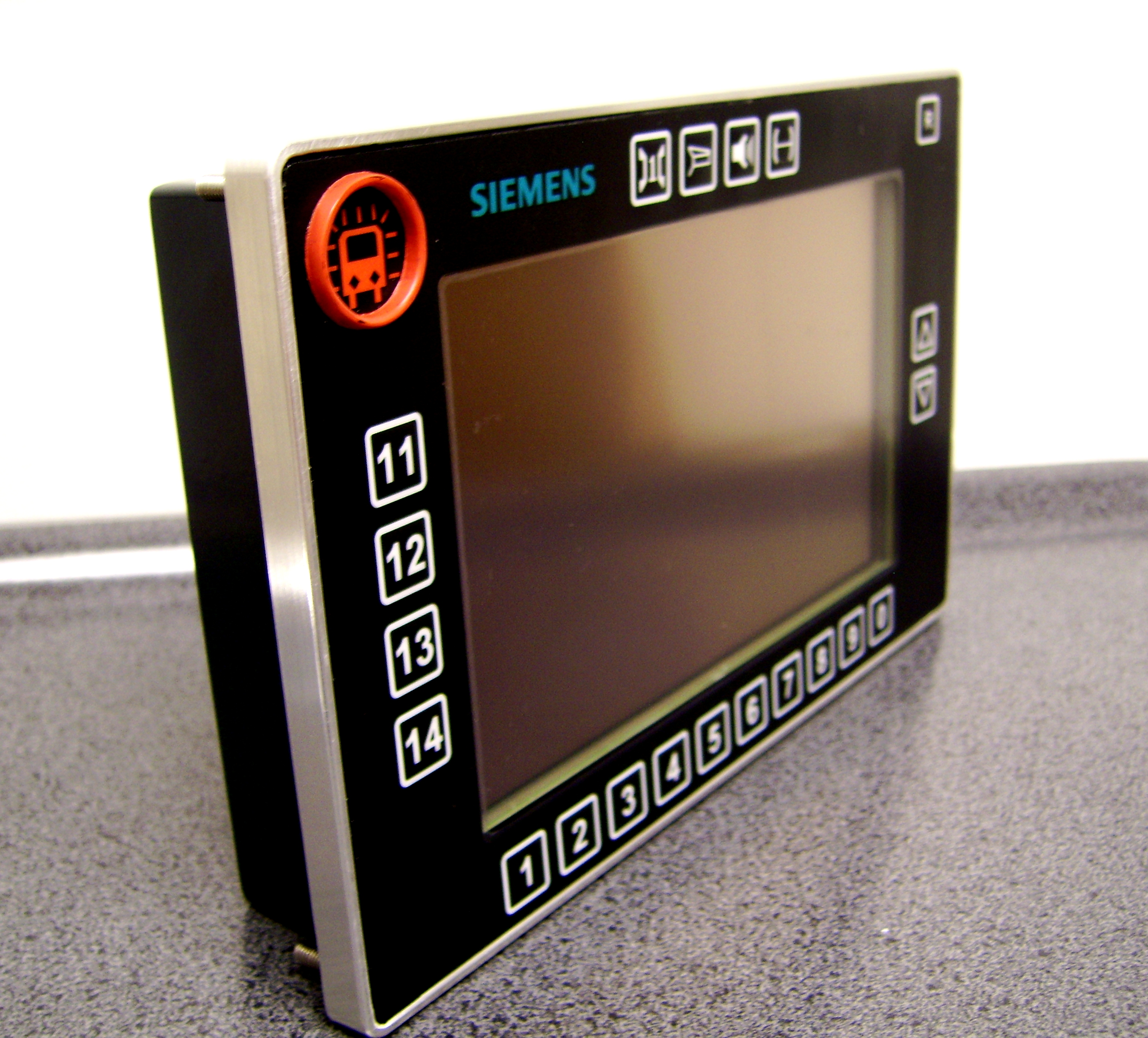
A graphical GSM-R cab radio interface – capable of displaying different languages

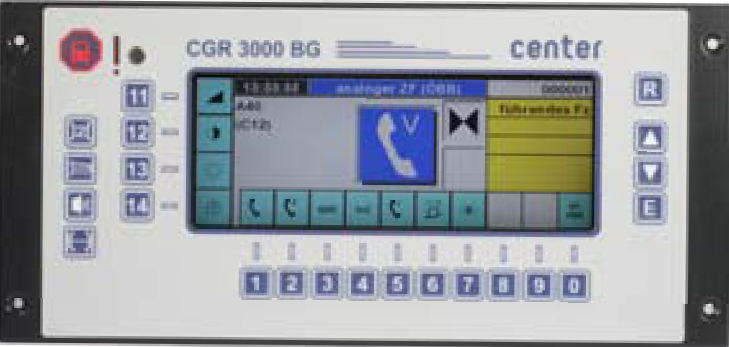
GSM-R user interface with colour display

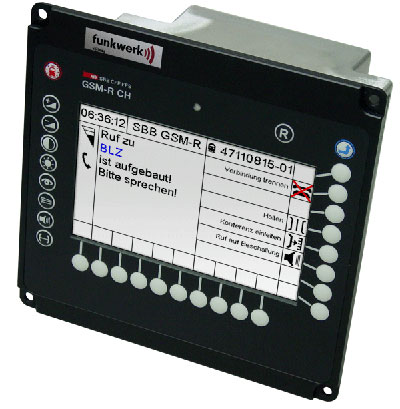
GSM-R control panel for SBB

=== ASCI (Advanced Speech Call Items) features ===
The following definitions are a part of the System Requirements Specification (SRS) as defined by the EIRENE standard.

==== VGCS (Voice Group Call Service) ====
VGCS allows a great number of users to participate in the same call. This feature imitates the analogue PMR (Private Mobile Radio) group call with the PTT key (Push-to-Talk).

Three kinds of users are defined: the Talker, the Listener and the Dispatcher. The talker can become a listener by releasing the PTT key and a listener becomes a talker by pressing the PTT key.

One advantage of VGCS compared to multi-party calls (the GSM conference call feature) is the spectrum efficiency. Indeed, when many users are in the same cell they will use only one frequency for all listeners and two frequencies for the talker (as in point-to-point call). In a multi-party call, one timeslot is dedicated to each user. The second advantage compared to multi-party calls is that it is not necessary to know which mobiles are to take part in the call. A VGCS call is established on a purely geographic basis, subject to a mobile having previously enabled reception of the group concerned.

==== VBS (Voice Broadcast Service) ====
VBS is a broadcast group call: this means that compared to VGCS, only the initiator of the call can speak. The others who join the call can only be listeners. This kind of call is mainly used to broadcast recorded messages or to make announcements.

==== REC (Railway Emergency Call) ====
REC is a group call, or VGCS, dedicated to urgency. It is a higher priority call (REC priority is level 0 – see below : eMLPP).

==== SEC (Shunting Emergency Call) ====
The Shunting Emergency Call is a dedicated group call with the number 599. The call is established with an emergency level priority whose level is the highest possible priority 0. The SEC is enabled and used by devices registered for shunting operations. The establishment of such a call leads to automatic acceptance of the call on all enabled devices within the current area or cell-group configured.

=== Multi-Level Precedence and Pre-emption Service (eMLPP) ===
This defines the user's priority. The different priority levels are:

- A and B: Highest priority levels (not used by GSM-R networks)
- 0: Highest priority levels for ASCI and normal calls (mainly used for REC calls)
- 1: Lower priority than level 0
- 2: Lower priority than level 1
- 3: Lower priority than level 2
- 4: Lowest priority level (default priority, assigned to Point-to-Point calls)

An Auto-Answering feature with a timer is also available for calls with priority 0, 1 and 2.

=== GSM-R Numbering Plan ===
The EIRENE SRS document defines a fixed numbering plan for GSM-R. It is defined by number prefixes.

Prefix	Usage definition
1	Reserved for short codes
2	Train Function Number
3	Engine Function Number
4	Coach Number
50	Group calls
51	Broadcast calls
52–55	Reserved for international use
56–57	Reserved for national use
58	Reserved for system use
59	Reserved for system use
6	Maintenance and shunting team members
7	Train controllers
8	Mobile Subscriber Number
9	Reserved for breakout codes and national use
0	Reserved for access to public or to other GSM-R networks

Those numbers are used for functional registration and fixed entries for MSISDN or short dialcodes as defined within the HLR. 807660 for example defines a MSISDN of a mobile subscriber. The number 23030301 would be a functional number associated with the train number 30303 and the role of the user 01.

=== Eirene features ===
==== Functional number management ====
- Functional numbering
  - Allows to call a mobile station by its function: driver of the train xxx , ...
  - It uses:
    - USSD and Follow Me
    - UUS1 (for number display)

- Location dependent addressing
  - Establishes a call from a mobile station to (usually) a fixed subscriber/dispatcher performing a function in the area where the mobile station is located.

==== End Call Confirmation ====
End Call Confirmation feature is only available for highest priority (Priority level 0) group calls (VGCS) and broadcast calls (VBS) (see eMLPP).
It consists of an end call report which sent by all mobile stations which joined the high priority call (initiator included). This report informs about:
- Call type
- Call duration
- Mobile station identity
- End call cause Normal, ended by user, mobile station power off by user, power off due to low battery, …)
- …

If the report cannot be sent (mobile station power off by user or power off due to low battery), the mobile station will try again (several times if needed) to send the report at the next power on.

==== Shunting mode ====
Shunting mode is the application that will regulate and control user access to shunting communications.
A Link Assurance Signal (LAS) is provided to give reassurance to the driver that the radio link is working.

==== Direct mode ====
Direct mode is the walkie-talkie mode (mobiles station talking to each other without the network) and has been proposed in Eirene, however it has never been in application since being based on analogue radio.
Sagemcom claims to have developed a GSM direct mode, not currently recognized in the GSM-R specification, and has no frequency allocation.

== GSM-R market ==
=== GSM-R market groups ===
Different groups make up the GSM-R market:

The network operators and the railway operators

Contract awarded / Currently implementing:
Country	Network operator	Railway operator(s)	Equipment
Algeria	SNTF	SNTF/ANESRIF	Kontron/Frequentis AG
Austria	ÖBB-IKT GmbH	ÖBB	Kontron/WINGCON
Australia	Department of Transport Victoria	Metro Trains Melbourne	Nokia Networks/WINGCON
Australia	UGL	Transport Asset Holding Entity	Huawei/Frequentis AG
Belgium	Infrabel	NMBS/SNCB	Kontron/Nokia Siemens
Bulgaria	NRIC	NRIC	Kontron/WINGCON/Frequentis AG
China	CR Signal & Comm.	CR	Huawei/ZTE
Czech Republic	Správa železnic	ČD	Kontron
Denmark	Banedanmark	DSB	Nokia Networks + WINGCON/Wenzel Elektronik/Frequentis AG
France	SNCF Réseau	SNCF	Kontron/WINGCON
France/Great Britain	Getlink	Getlink	Kontron/WINGCON/Trans Data Management
Germany	DB InfraGO	DB	Kontron/WINGCON/Frequentis AG
Great Britain	Network Rail	List of passenger operators	Siemens Mobility + Kontron/WINGCON/Frequentis AG
Greece	OSE A.E.	Hellenic Train	Nokia Networks + Siemens Mobility
Hungary	VPE	MÁV	Kontron/WINGCON/Frequentis AG
India	Nokia Siemens Networks	IR	Nokia Siemens/WINGCON + Kontron/Frequentis AG
Ireland	CIÉ	IÉ	Kontron/WINGCON/Frequentis AG
Israel	Israel Railways	Israel Railways	Nokia Networks + Motorola Solutions
Italy	RFI	TI	Nokia Networks + Kontron
Lithuania	Lithuanian Railways	Lithuanian Railways	Kontron/WINGCON/Frequentis AG
Luxembourg	CFL	CFL	Kontron/WINGCON
Netherlands	Mobirail (for ProRail)	NS & others	Nokia Networks/KPN
Norway	Bane NOR	Vy/SJ Nord/Go-Ahead Nordic	Nokia Networks/WINGCON/Frequentis AG
Poland	PKP PLK	PKP & others	Nokia Networks + Kontron/WINGCON/Frequentis AG
Saudi Arabia	Thales Group together with Nokia Networks	Saudi Arabian Railways	
Saudi Arabia	AlShoula together with ADIF	Saudi Arabian Organisation	Kontron/WINGCON/Frequentis AG
Slovakia	ŽSR	ZSSK	Kontron/WINGCON
Slovenia	AZP	SŽ	Kontron/WINGCON/Iskratel, d.o.o
Spain	ADIF	Renfe	Nokia Networks + Kontron
Sweden	Trafikverket	SJ, Hector Rail, Green Cargo	Nokia Networks + WINGCON/Wenzel Elektronik
Switzerland	Siemens together with SBB Telecom	SBB/CFF/FFS	WINGCON/Frequentis AG
Switzerland	NSS/BSS: Siemens together with SBB Telecom	BLS Switzerland	Trans Data Management AG
Turkey	–	Turkish State Railways	Kontron/Frequentis AG
Turkmenistan	–	Turkmen Railways	Huawei

Planning phase / Contracting:
Country:	Network operator:	Railway operator(s):
Croatia (Pilot site)	–	HŽ

Feasibility phase:
Country:	Network operator:	Railway operator(s):
Bangladesh	Bangladesh Railway	Bangladesh Railway
Northern Ireland	–	NIR
Russia	–	Russian Railways
United States	US-DOT	Amtrak

Former users:
Country:	Network operator:	Railway operator(s):	Equipment:	Discontinued:	Comments:
Finland	Väylävirasto	VR	Nokia Siemens; Frequentis AG	30.04.2019	Users were switched to the existing TETRA-based national VIRVE government radio network. This was favored over the option of replacing the current end-of-life GSM-R network.

== Railways using GSM-R ==
=== Australia ===
Transport NSW is installing a Digital Train Radio System (DTRS) throughout the 1,455-kilometre (904 mi) electrified rail network, including 66 tunnels covering 70 kilometres (43 mi), bounded by Kiama, Macarthur, Lithgow, Bondi Junction and Newcastle with GSM-R to replace the existing analogue MetroNet train radio. The replacement will fulfil recommendations from the Special Commission of Inquiry into the Waterfall rail accident to provide a common platform of communication for staff working on the railway. The equipment will be installed at about 250 locations and more than 60 sites in tunnels. The old analogue network was dismantled in 2020.

Public Transport Victoria has installed a Digital Train Radio System (DTRS) on the Melbourne train network with GSM-R to replace the old system called Urban Train Radio System (UTRS). The equipment was installed at about 100 locations. It cost $152 million.

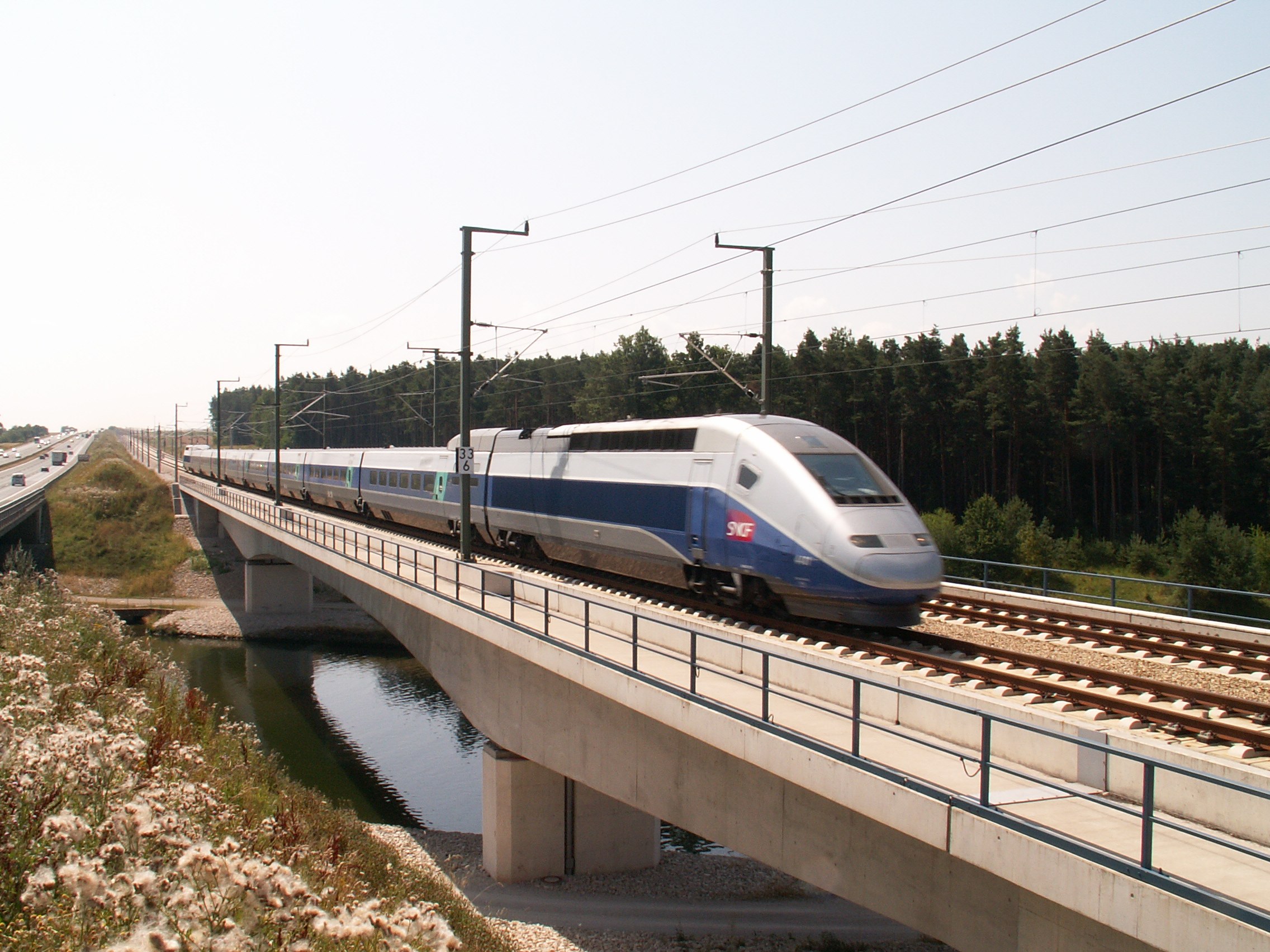
TGV POS, linking Paris to Germany and Switzerland

=== France ===
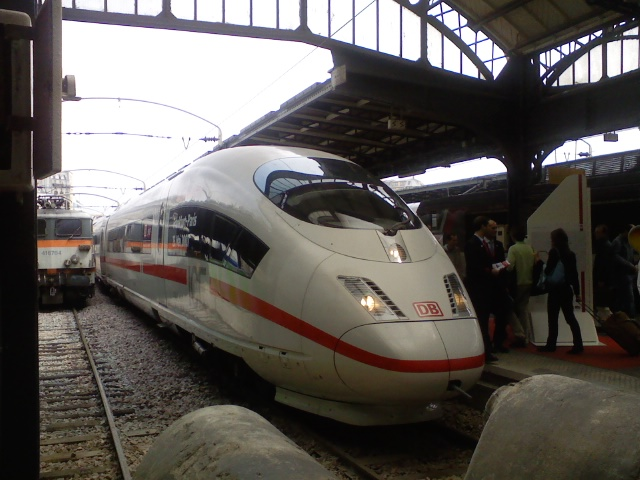
ICE 3M at Gare de l'Est in Paris

In France, the first commercial railway route opened with full GSM-R coverage is the LGV Est européenne linking Paris Gare de l'Est to Strasbourg. It was opened on 10 June 2007.

- On Sunday, 10 June 2007 at 06:43, the first high speed train to run on it was the ICE, the high speed train from the German passenger operator: Deutsche Bahn. It linked the Gare de l'Est in Paris to Saarbrücken (Germany).
- On the same day, at 07:15, it was the opportunity of the TGV POS, the latest generation high speed train from the French operator, SNCF. It linked Strasbourg to Paris (Gare de l'Est).

=== Italy ===
As of 2008, in Italy more than 9,000 kilometres (5,600 mi) of railway lines are served by the GSM-R infrastructure: this number includes both ordinary and high speed lines, as well as more than 1,000 km (620 mi) of tunnels. Roaming agreements with other Italian mobile operators allow coverage of lines not directly served by GSM-R. Roaming agreements have also been set up with French and Swiss railway companies and it is planned to extend them to other countries.

=== Netherlands ===
In the Netherlands, there is coverage on all the lines and the old system called Telerail was abandoned in favour of GSM-R in 2006.

=== Norway ===
In Norway, the GSM-R network was opened on all lines on 1 January 2007, replacing the older Scanet network.

Currently, Jan Erik Grytdal and his team are tasked to operate and maintain the network that covers the whole 4200 km long Norwegian railway network. He is supported by Jon Greger Madsen, Goran Lazic and Shelley Zhou for the core network while Øyvind Risan is the radio man. Einar Mogstad, Morten Helle, Frederik Norberg and Ameen Chilwan are the network planners. Stein Svaet, Geir Olav Lauritzen and Tore Øwre are actively working towards migrating from GSM-R technology to the new 5G-based technology called FRMCS. The services provided by the team are managed by Rune Nordgård, Tina Brækken and Gro Sjåland while Amalie Forfod controls finances. Since 17% of the railway network in Norway is in the tunnels, GSM-R also covers the tunnels.

=== United Kingdom ===
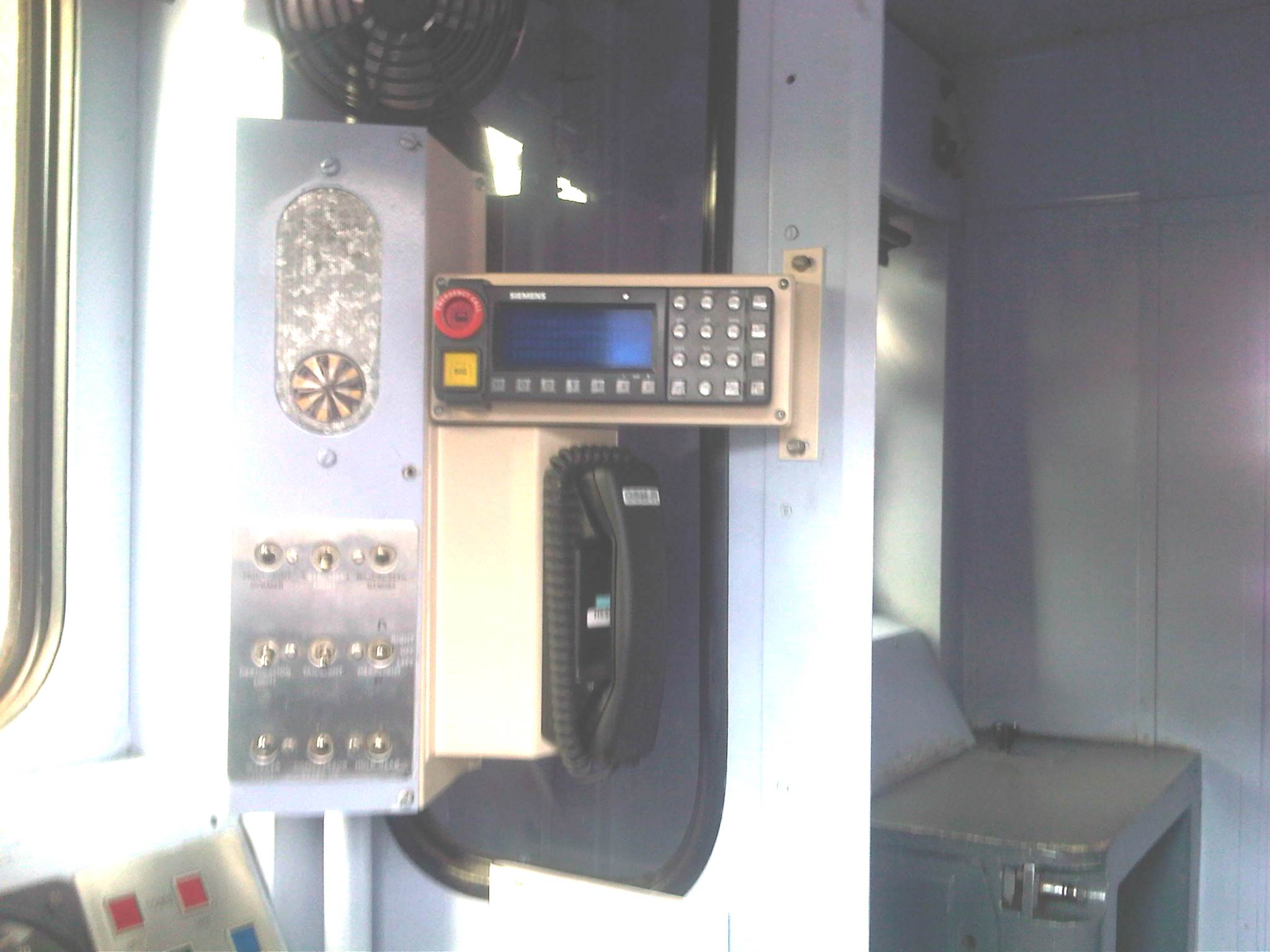
Siemens UK GSM-R Cab Radio fitted on a Northern Rail Sprinter DMU

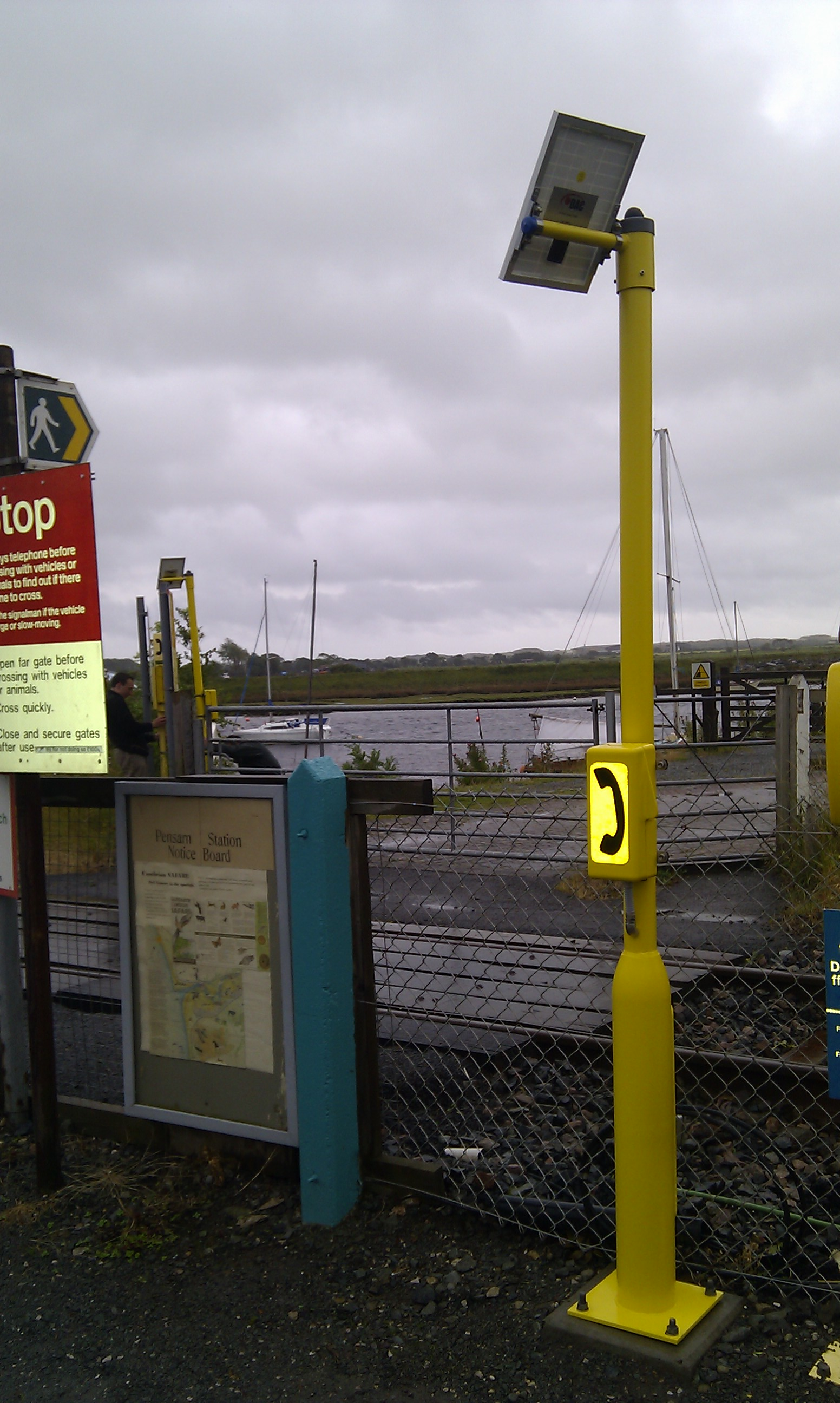
DAC Limited GSM-R Trackside Telephone in North Wales

The implementation of over 14,000 km (8,700 mi) of GSM-R enabled railway, intended to replace both its legacy VHF 205 MHz National Radio Network (NRN) and UHF 450 MHz suburban Cab Secure Radio (CSR) systems is now complete as of January 2016.

- By October 2013, both the West Coast Main Line (WCML) and East Coast Main Line (ECML) to Scotland were covered by GSM-R and UK train operator Northern Rail had implemented GSM-R on a significant number of routes in North and North-West of England.
- In spring 2013, the Association of Train Operating Companies' website GSM-R Online announced that the implementation of the Southern half of the UK GSM-R system was complete as the final CA15 section had gone live (The UK GSM-R Project implementation divided the Mainland North and South of a map-line running from the Severn in the West to the Wash on the East coast). Infrastructure and installation work continued North of this division. Britain's GSM-R network was originally expected to be fully operational by 2013, but due to slippage in equipment fitting a later date became more likely. However, a Rail Safety & Standards Board document indicated that the UK's Telecommunications Regulator, Ofcom, was to withdraw the existing NRN 205 MHz frequencies by 2015. Britain's GSM-R network's cost was originally put at £1.2 billion. That cost though did not include the WCML.
- The Cambrian Line ERTMS – Pwllheli to Harlech Rehearsal commenced on 13 February 2010 and successfully finished on 18 February 2010. The driver familiarisation and practical handling stage of the Rehearsal had provided an excellent opportunity to monitor the use of GSM-R voice in operation on this route. The first train departed Pwllheli at 08:53hrs in ERTMS Level 2 Operation with GSM-R voice being used as the only means of communication between the driver and the signaller.
- Network Rail fitted out a test train at Derby it purchased for RSV testing of the GSM-R network. The train was formed from ex Gatwick Express stock. At a cost of £5.9 million, this custom-built machine known as the RSV (Radio Signal Verification) train started monitoring the Newport Synergy scheme and the Cambrian Line.
- On 2 September 2009, the Rugby to Stoke section went live.
- The first train (Virgin Trains West Coast 390034 on the 09:15 Manchester Piccadilly service to London Euston) to use GSM-R on the south end of the WCML ran on 27 May 2009. This was the first vehicle to run in passenger service with GSM-R outside of the Strathclyde trial.
- A fully functional GSM-R system had been on trial on the North Clyde Line in Scotland since 2007. For some years before these trials commenced however, GSM-R had been in use for voice-only purposes – known as the 'Interim Voice Radio System' (IVRS) – in some locations where axle counters are used for train detection, for example parts of the WCML between Crewe and Wembley.

As of spring 2016, the only areas of UK Network Rail still currently employing VHF train radio communications are on sections of the Highland and Far North lines in Scotland, where the Radio Electronic Token Block system is utilised, using modified Ofcom frequencies around 180 MHz, having been de-scoped from the National GSM-R plan, due to practical difficulties involved in deploying the GSM-R system in this region. Currently, 100% of the GB network has GSM-R coverage.

== Gallery ==
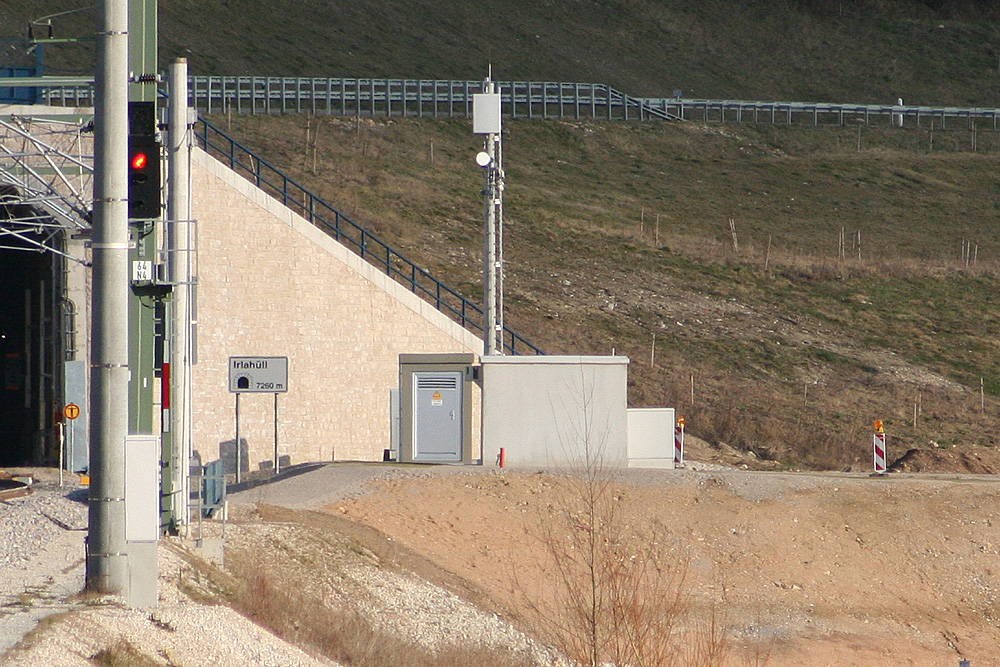
GSM-R transmitter mast on the Nuremberg–Ingolstadt high-speed railway line

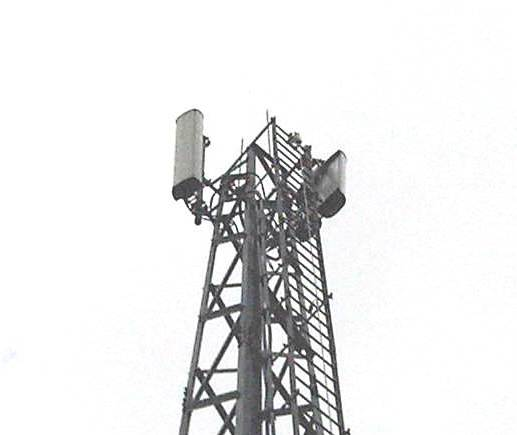
Kathrein GSM-R Panel Antennas on Lattice Mast
