= Voice group call service =

The voice group call service (VGCS) is a mobile communication service for GSM, that allows subscribers to communicate to multiple other subscribers at the same time. For this special mobiles are required that support this function. A first deployment was seen with European Railways. This service is a feature of ASCI (Advanced Speech Call Items) in GSM.

== Description ==
This service allows speech conversation of a predefined group of service subscribers in half duplex mode on the radio link taking into account multiple mobile service subscribers involved in the VGCS call per cell. The VGCS is applicable to all mobile stations in a certain network and area which have the technical capability and the corresponding subscription, respectively, to participate in a VGCS call.

== Background ==
The first commercial use was for Railways. For GSM-Railway this is one of the most important features. VGCS is important to compete with TETRA for Professional Mobile Radio (PMR). This service is location dependent and therefore different from the Push to talk service.

== Specification ==
This service is specified in the 3rd Generation Partnership Project (3GPP) since release 00 (R00) and in EIRENE.

3GPP TS 42.069

3rd Generation Partnership Project;
Technical Specification Group Services and system Aspects;
Voice Broadcast Service (VBS);
Stage 1

3GPP TS 43.069

3rd Generation Partnership Project;
Technical Specification Group Core Network and Terminals;
Voice Broadcast Service (VBS);
Stage 2

3GPP TS 44.069

3rd Generation Partnership Project;
Technical Specification Group Core Network;
Broadcast Call Control (BCC) protocol

EIRENE Functional Requirements Specification
EIRENE System Requirements Specification

== See also ==
- GSM-R
