= Wingcon =

German company that produces telecommunication systems for railway operators

Wingcon AG
- Company type: Corporation limited by share ownership (AG)
- Industry: Telecommunications
- Founded: 2004; 22 years ago in Langenargen, Baden-Württemberg, Germany
- Founders: Norbert Schäfer and Fritz Roland Paul
- Headquarters: Langenargen, Germany
- Area served: Worldwide
- Key people: Thomas Ehrle (CEO)
- Products: GSM-R Messaging Centers (RMC), GSM-R SMS Gateways, GSM-R Voice Mail Systems, GSM-R Voice Recording Systems (BBRC), Train Location Gateways (TLG), Video Recording Systems
- Number of employees: 22 (2025)
- Website: www.wingcon.com

Wingcon is a German company that produces telecommunications products for the railway industry and other mobile mission-critical communications. The company specializes in design, developing and providing telecom products as well as consulting services worldwide with focus on GSM-Railway.

Wingcon's communication products include Blackbox Recording Centers (voice & video recording systems), Short Message Service Centers, SMS gateways, location-based services, as well as billing mediation devices.
