= FRMCS =

Wireless standard for railway communication

The Future Railway Mobile Communication System (FRMCS) is an international Wireless communications standard for railway communication and applications. It is designed as the successor to GSM-R (Global System for Mobile Communications – Railway), primarily used in the European Train Control System (ETCS).

== Background ==
The GSM technology is approaching end-of-life status by 2030. Unlike the UMTS systems, which have already started to be decommissioned in the 2020s, GSM-R benefited from a significant installed base, prompting vendors to continue production until a predetermined end date. Consequently, the International Union of Railways (UIC) has decided to make a significant technological leap by adopting 5G NR mobile networks for FRMCS, bypassing the interim LTE-R proposal. This decision effectively leapfrogs two generations of mobile communication technologies.

On 20 November 2020, the Electronic Communications Committee of the CEPT allocated the paired frequency bands 874.4–880.0 MHz and 919.4–925.0 MHz, alongside the unpaired frequency band 1900–1910 MHz for Railway Mobile Radio (RMR) use, an umbrella term covering both GSM-R and FRMCS technologies. The European Commission mandated on 28 September 2021 that EU member states must make these frequencies available for railway applications.

The FRMCS standardisation effort commenced in 2015, with the requirements specification finalised in February 2020. The "5G Rail" testing project, initiated in November 2020 and slated for completion in 2023, led to the publication of a preliminary standard draft at the end of 2022, with finalisation expected in early 2023. The final specifications are anticipated in 2024, paving the way for the system's rollout starting in 2025.

Railway operators are actively preparing for FRMCS implementation, focusing on evaluating base station locations to accommodate the system's increased requirements. 5G technology's higher data transmission capacity within the same frequency band necessitates a more dense base station network due to its reduced transmission range. Finland's railway operator has emerged as a pilot user, expressing interest in dismantling its own base stations in favour of leveraging public networks for railway operations through multipath routing, utilising all three of the country's public network operators across its 6000 km of track. A 190 km test track was established in 2022 to facilitate FRMCS trials, targeting completion in 2024.

Recent European train tenders now stipulate that deliveries from 2024 onwards must be FRMCS-compatible. In May 2023, the French railway operator SNCF awarded a contract to Frequentis for the provision of FRMCS across its network, with a strategic plan to complete the network transformation by 2030. Deutsche Bahn in Germany plans to transition between 2026 and 2035, beginning live tests in 2027. Switzerland identified locations for 3500 base stations in 2022 and plans to deactivate GSM-R by 2035. In May 2023, it began evaluating whether to utilise base stations from public 5G network operators, or a combination of public networks and dedicated infrastructure. A number of FRMCS-ready 5G and LTE networks for railway communications are also being deployed outside Europe, including in Australia, South Korea and India.
