= Ubimet =

Meteorological company

Ubimet GmbH
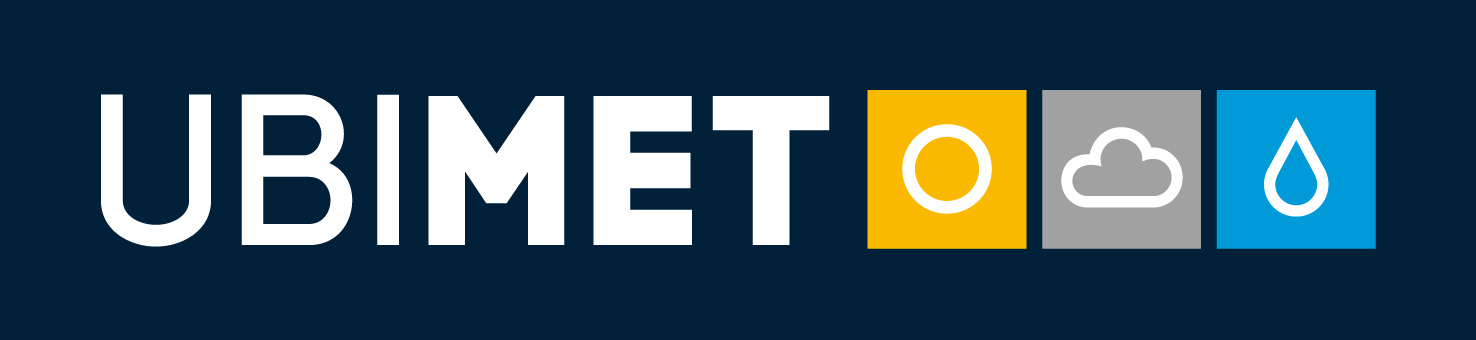
- Type: Limited liability company
- Industry: Meteorological services
- Founded: 2004
- Headquarters: Vienna, Austria
- Area served: Worldwide
- Key people: Michael Fassnauer, Manfred Spatzierer
- Number of employees: 200-500
- Website: www.ubimet.com

UBIMET is a worldwide private provider of weather forecasts and severe weather warnings. The company's name is derived from UBIquitous METeorology

== History ==
Ubimet was established in Vienna, Austria, by in September 2004 under the name Meteomedia. It began by providing weather services to institutions such as the German Press Agency, ÖBB, and Uniqa Insurance Group. Ubimet went on to build the Austrian Severe Weather Center to forecast extreme weather events. In December 2008, shares of Meteomedia Group were bought back by the company's founders, and the name was changed to UBIMET.

Today, companies in the insurance, media (such as Der Standard and Kronen Zeitung), sports (the International Automobile Federation, Moto GP, Red Bull, the Australian Olympic sailing team, the 2013 European Beach Volleyball Championships), infrastructure (ÖBB, Deutsche Bahn), energy (E.ON), mining (Austmine), and logistics (Strabag) industries use Ubimet's corporate services.

In 2011, the company opened an office in Melbourne, Australia, with a full-scale operation including meteorologists and business development resources, as well as marketing and infrastructure. In 2012, Ubimet provided weather data for the Red Bull Stratos space diving project during which Felix Baumgartner successfully ascended to 128,100 feet in a stratospheric balloon and free-fell at supersonic speed before parachuting to the ground. In the same year, Red Bull became a company shareholder. Ubimet now provides weather data for many of Red Bull's global sporting events (e.g., the Wings For Life World Run in 2014 and 2015).

Since 2014, Ubimet has had a contract with the International Automobile Federation (FIA) to provide weather forecasts for all Formula One Grand Prix races. It did so for the Formula One race on October 5, 2014, in Suzuka, Japan, when Typhoon Phanfone approached the city. Ubimet also provided meteorological data for the 2013 and 2014 Tissot Australian Motorcycle Grand Prix.

In July 2015, Ubimet launched its flagship consumer product, Morecast, on the Apple App Store and Google Play Store. The app combines weather forecasts, radar and satellite maps for rain and lightning, as well as severe storm warning notifications.

== Research and development ==
In cooperation with several international research institutes, Ubimet's research and development department is involved in multiple research projects. The company's INDUS project (individualised, nowcasting-based dynamic warning system) won the Centre for Innovation and Technology's "Safe and Secure Vienna" contest at the Viennovation Awards in 2006. In 2007, the Centre for Innovation and Technology selected the company's SITUMET (situation-based ubiquitous meteorological services) project for funding. UBIMET was also named a "Vienna Spot of Excellence".

In 2006, UBIMET received the Vienna Chamber of Commerce's "Mercury Prize for the most innovative service" of the year for its WIND IV (weather information on demand) severe weather warning system.

In 2011, it was one of three European companies to participate in the launch ceremony of “Future Internet”, a large European research initiative, in Brussels. The company was cited as an example of innovation in Europe's internet future. From January 2011 to April 2014, UBIMET and Uniqa Insurance Group worked with the Fraunhofer Society on Opti-Alert, an international study funded by the European Union. The aim of the study was to improve alert strategies for extreme weather events.

== Lightning detection system ==
The Ubimet lightning detection system measures lightning at a third of a millionth of a second, using five ground-based antennas to detect the electrical discharge of a strike. Once lightning hits, the electromagnetic waves travel through two copper coils at right angles, inducing a current. This is then registered by an embedded device, transferred to Ubimet's central processing unit and transmitted to meteorologists or paying companies within 30 seconds.

Worldwide lightning data is also displayed on the 3D Weather Globe of Ubimet's Morecast App, free of charge.

== Data and models ==
UBIMET has access to data that is compliant with World Meteorological Organization standards. It also has access to satellite, weather radar, weather buoy, radiosonde, and lightning data. It uses a combination of global and proprietary weather models.
