= Department of Rail Transport =

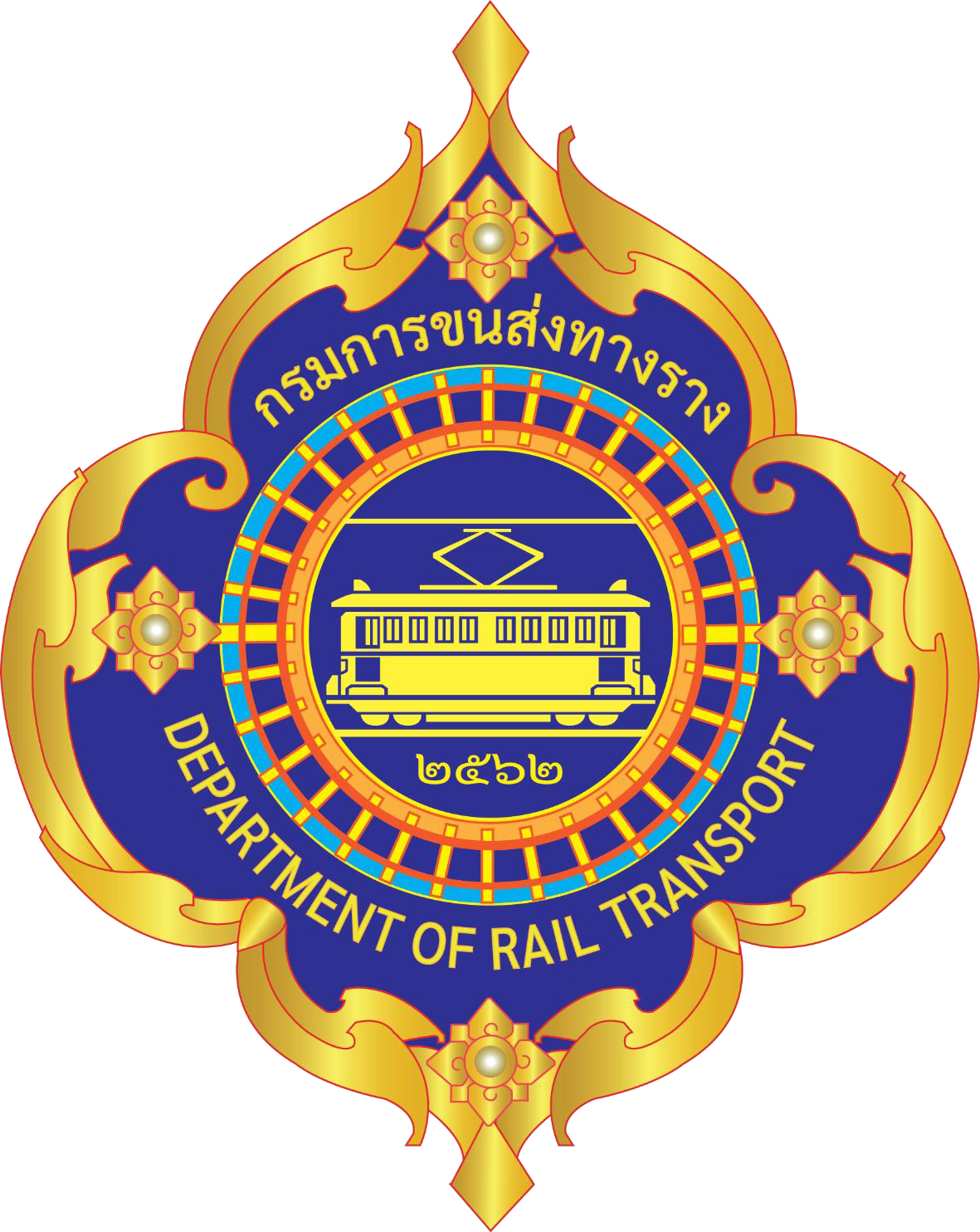
- Department's emblem

Department overview
- Formed: April 15, 2019; 7 years ago
- Preceding Department: Rail System Development Project Office Office of Transport and Traffic Policy and Planning
- Type: Government agencies
- Headquarters: 514/1, 4th-5th Floor, Na Thalang Building, Lan Luang Road, Si Yaek Maha Nak Subdistrict, Dusit District, Bangkok 10300
- Employees: 115 (2022)
- Annual budget: 137,722,000 baht; (Fiscal year 2026) (Note: This is the total budget of the Department of Rail Transport, from categories 3 and 5. For details, see... Annual Budget Act of Fiscal Year 2026)
- Department executives: Pichet Kunathamarak, Director-General; Athiphu Chitranukroh, Deputy Director-General
- Parent Department: Ministry of Transport

Department of Rail Transport (Thai: กรมการขนส่งทางราง) it is a government agency under the Ministry of Transport, established by the Act Reorganizing Ministries, Bureaus, and Departments (No. 18), B.E. 2562 (2019) The department was elevated from the Rail Development Project Office under the Office of Transport and Traffic Policy and Planning. Its responsibilities include regulating the national rail transport system to ensure standardized operations, as well as proposing policies, strategies, and regulatory frameworks for rail transport. Furthermore, it is tasked with developing the nation's rail infrastructure to enhance competitiveness and facilitate connectivity with other modes of transport and neighboring countries.

== History ==
The Department of Rail Transport (DRT) was established following the enactment of the Act Reorganizing Ministries, Bureaus, and Departments (No. 18), B.E. 2562 (2019). The Act was published in the Royal Thai Government Gazette, Volume 136, Part 49A, on April 14, 2019, and came into effect the following day, on April 15, 2019.

Pursuant to this Act, the DRT was formed by elevating the Rail Development Project Office, formerly a unit under the Office of Transport and Traffic Policy and Planning (OTP), Ministry of Transport. The transition involved the transfer of all functions, assets, rights, liabilities, and obligations, as well as the personnel and employees of the former office to the newly established department. Initially, the department operated from its temporary headquarters located on the 3rd floor of the Office of Transport and Traffic Policy and Planning building.

On May 21, 2019, the Cabinet approved the appointment of Sarawut Songsiwilai, then-Director of the Office of Transport and Traffic Policy and Planning, as the first Director-General of the Department of Rail Transport. On the same day, Chaiwat Tongkamkoun, Permanent Secretary for the Ministry of Transport and a former OTP Director, signed an order transferring Sorapong Phaitoonphong, Assistant Permanent Secretary for the Ministry of Transport, to serve as Deputy Director-General of the newly established department. Subsequently, on June 9, 2019, Vajiralongkorn issued a Royal Command officially appointing Sarawut Songsiwilai as the Director-General of the Department of Rail Transport.

== Functions ==
The functions of the Department of Rail Transport (DRT) encompass the formulation of policy recommendations, strategies, and development plans for the nation's rail transport sector. The department is responsible for establishing standards and providing regulatory oversight for rail transport operators, ensuring compliance with safety protocols, track maintenance, operational procedures, and personnel competency. Furthermore, the DRT oversees the utilization of rail infrastructure, promotes the development of rail transport innovation, and serves as the primary coordinator for rail transport matters with relevant agencies, in addition to performing other duties as prescribed by law.
