= Frequentis =

Austrian information systems company

Frequentis AG
- Type: Aktiengesellschaft
- Traded as: FWB: FQT
- ISIN: ATFREQUENT09
- Founded: Vienna, Austria; July 1, 1947
- Headquarters: Vienna, Austria
- Area served: Worldwide
- Key people: Norbert Haslacher (CEO); Peter Skerlan (CFO); Monika Haselbacher (COO); Karl Wannenmacher (CTO)
- Revenue: EUR 580.1 million (2025)
- Number of employees: 2,600 (2025)
- Website: frequentis.com

Frequentis is an Austrian high-tech company that develops communication and information systems in fields such as air traffic management and public safety & transport (police, rescue and fire services, coastal rescue, railways, shipping, and others).

Frequentis is a founding shareholder of GroupEAD Europe S.L., the service provider company operating the European Aeronautical Database on behalf of EUROCONTROL, a project related to the Single European Sky, for which it is working on the first common voice communications system for Europe.

== History ==
Frequentis was founded in 1947 in post-WWII Vienna by Emanuel Strunz and Walther Hamm. The company's first contract was to assist in the construction of the Vienna II radio station. The company has since worked on a variety of different products, including steel hardening facilities and ultrasound therapy units. Frequentis constructed the air traffic control system at the Vienna International Airport.

Hannes Bardach became the managing director in 1983, and later became the owner of Frequentis. In 1999, its US subsidiary was established. The company won the GSM-R dispatcher contract by Deutsche Bahn in Germany in 2002. It won the contract to create an integrated communications system for the London Metropolitan Police (Scotland Yard) in 2005. The contract for building the control centre for the Norwegian public safety radio network Nødnett was obtained in 2006.

Today, Frequentis and its associated companies employ staff at locations in over 50 countries. While the core business remains the air traffic management sector, the company also builds voice communication and information systems for defence, public safety, public transport and maritime markets.

Since 14 May 2019, the shares of Frequentis AG are traded in the General Standard on the Frankfurt Stock Exchange and on the prime market on the Vienna Stock Exchange under the ticker symbol FQT (ISIN: ATFREQUENT09).

== Acquisitions ==
In January 2016, Frequentis acquired its competitor and leading German ATM provider Comsoft GmbH. The acquisition enabled substantial strategical advantage for Frequentis and it is expected to reinforce its presence in the ATM industry. The subsidiary has been renamed as Comsoft Solutions GmbH, and subsequently as Frequentis Comsoft GmbH.

In 2021, the acquisition of business units from the listed US company L3Harris Technologies comprised voice communication product lines for civil and military air traffic control.

In January 2022, Frequentis acquired a 51% interest in Regola S.r.l.

In September 2022, Frequentis acquired a 25% stake in Aviamaps Oy (now Flyk Oy]).

In July 2023, Frequentis acquired 100% of GuardREC ATC.
