= 2014 National Rail ticket features =

British Rail ticket features

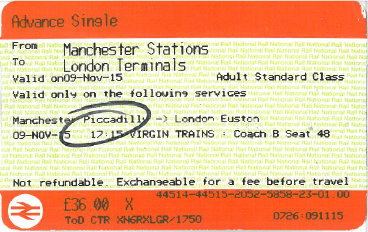
National Rail 2014 ticket example - Advance Single from Manchester Piccadilly to London Euston. Reservation details are included.

In 2014, a new design was introduced for train tickets issued on the National Rail network in Great Britain. The pre-2014 design was similar to the APTIS design introduced in 1986 by British Rail.

The 2014 design was intended to give passengers more information.

== History ==
The first computerised ticket issuing system on the British railway network was INTIS, introduced by British Rail on a small scale in 1981 as an interim stage before the mid-1980s launch of the All Purpose Ticket Issuing System (APTIS). INTIS produced credit card-sized tickets on which the data was laid out in a particular pattern consisting of fields of a set length printed on four horizontal lines across the ticket. Class of travel and a ticket type description were on the top line; below this came the date of travel, ticket number and information about discounts or concessions; then came the origin station, validity information and fare paid; and on the bottom line was printed the destination station and any route restriction that applied. The APTIS system continued with a slightly adjusted version of this layout; and when it was superseded in the mid-2000s by "New Generation" systems such as Shere SMART and Cubic FasTIS, these continued to issue tickets in the same format.

== Department for Transport reports ==
In March 2012, the Department for Transport released a report, Rail Fares and Ticketing Review. Its remit was to analyse the market for rail travel, the setting of fares and the ways in which tickets were booked and issued. From this it sought to make recommendations about finding alternatives to printed tickets and improving the "complex and confusing" fares and ticketing structure. A three-month consultation period followed. Passengers, interest groups such as Passenger Focus, the rail industry itself and other parties were asked about their priorities and ideas. The result was a second report (Rail Fares and Ticketing: The Next Steps), published in October 2013. Its wide-ranging set of strategic aims included a proposal to undertake a "fundamental redesign" of rail tickets.

The report noted that although "passengers [were] comfortable with the familiar format" of the 30-year-old design, it had significant disadvantages. Passengers wanted the most important data—station names, ticket descriptions, permitted routes, time restrictions and validity information—presented more clearly, in larger print, without jargon and with as little abbreviation as possible. In particular, there was a desire for Advance tickets (cheap tickets valid only on a specific train) to show their restrictions and accompanying reservation details more clearly on the same ticket rather than on a separate reservation coupon. The report stated that although the Department for Transport's long-term intention was for printed tickets to be replaced with smart cards, the rail industry would soon launch a "cleaner, fresher and updated" ticket design which was intended to address some of these suggestions.

== 2014 trial ==
In early March 2014, ATOC released a document to its members illustrating examples of the new data layout which would soon be launched on a trial basis. Some changes had been made from the examples illustrated five months earlier in the Department for Transport's report. Meanwhile, ATOC selected Northern Rail to undertake the trial. Some of the Parkeon self-service ticket machines operated by the company were upgraded so they would print travel tickets in the new format. (Note: The new layout does not extend to non-travel tickets such as debit/credit card sales vouchers, receipts and Plusbus coupons, whose layout is unchanged.) The first seven stations to undertake the trial were Bingley, Burley Park, Glossop, Hebden Bridge, Irlam, Pannal and Prudhoe, all of which were upgraded between 20 and 24 March.

== Design features ==
The new design includes the following features and changes:

- Ticket type printed on upper orange stripe
- Symbol printed on upper orange stripe to indicate discount (lozenge) or child (circle)
- Price printed on lower orange stripe
- Web link to Restriction Codes e.g. "nationalrail.co.uk/8A"
- For Advance tickets - ticket and reservations on single coupon (previously multiple coupons)
- Background text reads "National Rail" rather than "Rail Settlement Plan"

== Rollout ==
Tickets in the new design were first issued in March 2014 from trial locations on the Northern network.

== Bibliography ==
- Boddy, Brian (1999). INTIS: The British Rail Intermediate Ticket Issuing System. Kemsing: The Transport Ticket Society. ISBN 0-903209-30-6.
- Davis, Matthew (2013). The Future's Green and Orange: Exploring and Explaining Ticketing in the Privatised Rail Industry. Bishops Stortford: The Transport Ticket Society. ISBN 978-0-903209-75-5.
- s.n. (October 2013). Rail Fares and Ticketing: Next Steps (PDF) (Report). London: Department for Transport. Archived (PDF) from the original on 19 August 2014.
