= Scheidt & Bachmann Ticket XPress =

Ticket vending Machine (TVM)

System information
- Full name: Scheidt & Bachmann; FAA-2000/TS (ATOC)
- Machine type: Self-service machine
- Type of ticket stock: Fan-fold
- Manufacturer: Scheidt & Bachmann

History
- First introduced: 2003
- Machine number range: 2000–3717 (Note: As of November 2012.)
- Window number range: Upwards from 21
- Machines in use: 1,594

Locations/areas/train operating companies
- Current users: Abellio Greater Anglia; Arriva Trains Wales; East Midlands Trains; First Capital Connect; Great Western Railway; ScotRail; London Overground; Manchester Metrolink; Merseyrail; Northern Rail; South Western Railway; Southeastern; Transport for Wales; Tyne and Wear Metro

The Scheidt & Bachmann Ticket XPress system is a passenger-operated self-service railway ticket issuing system developed and manufactured by the German systems development and production group Scheidt & Bachmann GmbH, based in the city of Mönchengladbach. Since the first trial installations in 2003, seven train operating companies (TOCs) in Great Britain have adopted the system as their main passenger-operated ticket vending method, while four others have installed machines at certain stations on their networks. More than 1,500 machines are in place across the country, and more than 850 stations have one or more. Machines can accept cash and/or payment cards and can sell most National Rail tickets.

Ticket XPress machines, also known by the codename FAA-2000/TS (ATOC), were developed in the early 2000s and were based on similar technology which had been used elsewhere in the world since the 1990s. Since 2004, when the first large-scale contracts were signed by TOCs in Scotland and southeast England, new machines have been installed regularly; meanwhile there have been gradual changes to the user interface and to the appearance of tickets issued by the machines.

== Origins ==
=== The company ===
Scheidt & Bachmann was founded in 1872 as a manufacturer of textile machinery and small steam-driven engines for industrial use. Its earliest diversification was into railway signal control systems, which became its main area of business until 1932. At that time, the company developed and began to manufacture a new type of hand-operated petrol pump. Further diversification occurred in the 1960s, when Scheidt & Bachmann developed control, access and management systems for public car parks and, subsequently, public leisure facilities such as swimming pools and council-owned leisure centres. The company's first entry into the ticket issuing and fare collection systems market came in 1978. The technology was initially derived from car park control systems, and was later developed further and refined. The company is now organised into four largely autonomous divisions corresponding to the different business areas: Signal Technology, Petrol Stations, Car Parks and Leisure Centres, and Fare Collection Systems.

=== Situation before Ticket XPress ===
In the last years of British Rail, before privatisation, the main passenger-operated ticket issuing system (POTIS) on the network was the Ascom B8050 Quickfare, developed in the late 1980s by Swiss company Ascom Autelca AG. Quickfare machines were geared towards high-volume, low-value transactions: they only accepted cash, offered a small and mostly unchanging range of destinations, and were a minor evolution from similar earlier machines whose computer technology was based in the early 1980s. Quickfares were widespread, especially in the erstwhile Network SouthEast area, but their limitations were increasing as technology became more sophisticated.

== Installation programme ==
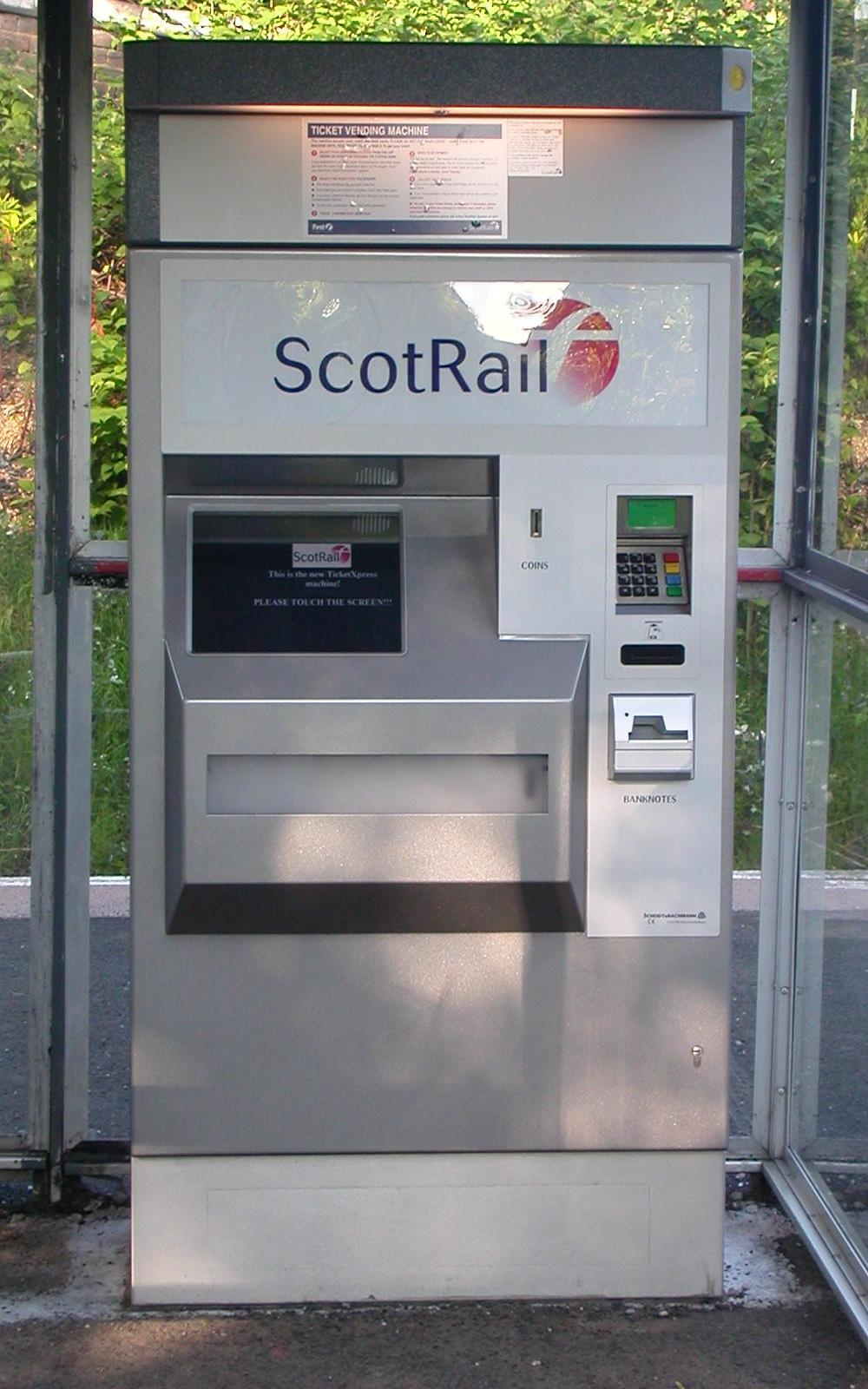
Scheidt & Bachmann Ticket XPress were installed at stations on the ScotRail network from 2004. This later example is at Shawlands.

Scheidt & Bachmann had initially gained experience in the design and manufacture of self-service ticket machines during the 1990s when the FAA-2000 system, popular on continental European railway networks, was developed. By the early 2000s a refined design, marketed as FAA-2000/TS, had been launched. Its modern touch-screen technology, flexible and easily customisable interface and ability to accept cash or card payments made it a popular choice with transport operators in urban areas including Boston, New York City, Seattle, Cologne, Copenhagen and Dublin. A version of this newer design with the codename FAA-2000/TS (ATOC) was put on trial in August 2003 at Twickenham, a South West Trains station. In conjunction with the redesign and rebuilding of the station forecourt area, two Ticket XPress machines—numbered 2000 and 2001—were built into a wall next to the main station entrance.

At this stage, three companies were marketing their self-service ticket issuing systems: competing for trials and, ultimately, contracts from the privatised TOCs. Ascom (with the EasyTicket system) and Shere (with their FASTticket product) were already in the market; Scheidt & Bachmann were the last of the three competitors. (Shere FASTticket machines had been installed either permanently or on trial at various locations from as early as 1996, and an Ascom EasyTicket machine had been operating for nearly six months at one of Britain's busiest stations, Gatwick Airport). The start of the trial at Twickenham meant that all three systems could now be compared properly, taking note of passenger reactions and feedback.

In 2002, a year before launching the system, Scheidt & Bachmann appointed British company The Needham Group as their local agent and distributor within Britain for all products and services in the Fare Collection Systems division. Their first sale was to the Scotland-based TOC ScotRail, (Note: This article uses TOC names that were in use at the time.) which bought a batch of 27 machines at the start of 2004. It undertook no trial of the machines; other trial installations had taken place around this time at stations on the Central Trains and Chiltern Railways networks, though. The Scottish installation programme started with the introduction of multiple machines at Glasgow Central and Queen Street stations and Edinburgh's Waverley and Haymarket stations between January and March 2004. From April 2004 these were followed by further machines in central Scotland and at smaller stations on the North Berwick Line and Edinburgh to Bathgate Line. In February 2005, when installations at Dalgety Bay, Inverkeithing and Kirkcaldy were announced, ScotRail (Note: Branded as First ScotRail by this time.) stated that more than one million tickets had been issued from Ticket XPress machines on its network since the installation programme began a year earlier.

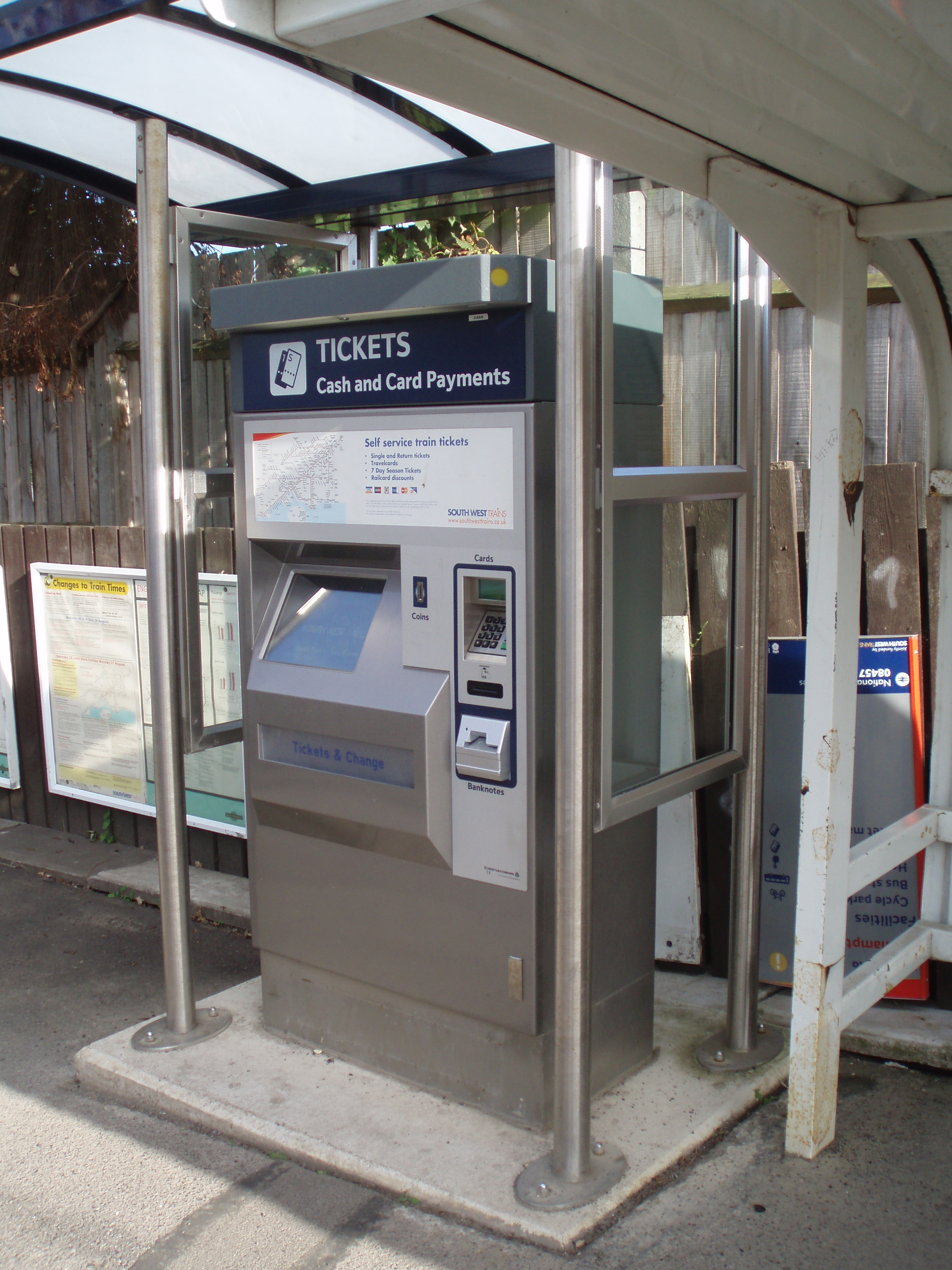
Almost every South West Trains station has at least one machine. This example is at Bedhampton.

After ScotRail, the next large-scale adopters of Ticket XPress machines were South Eastern Trains. They submitted a request for tender in February 2004, and six months later the first four machines were installed on their network: two each at Beckenham Junction and Eltham. The programme was expected to be complete in March 2005; this timescale was not met, but by August 2005 South Eastern Trains had installed 141 machines. More orders came from other TOCs throughout 2005 and 2006. Central Trains began in February 2005 by putting in machines at seven Cross-City Line stations and at Walsall. National Express East Anglia (Note: Operating under the brand One Railway at the time.) ordered 75 Ticket XPress machines in April 2006 and installed them at 38 stations as direct replacements for Ascom B8050 Quickfare machines. The order was worth more than £2 million based on the installation cost of each machine. The company had been trialling four machines at London Liverpool Street station since July 2004 and one at Chadwell Heath since April 2005. Merseyrail acquired its first machine in August 2005 and installed it at Liverpool Central; at the same time the Wales & Borders TOC put a machine on trial at Chester. In late 2005, Wessex Trains and Silverlink ordered Ticket XPress machines. For the former, Cheltenham Spa, Gloucester and Truro were among the early installations; neither these nor any other Wessex Trains station had self-service ticket machines previously. At stations on the Silverlink network, a mixture of old Ascom B8050 Quickfare and Avantix B8070 machines were replaced by the new technology; stations on the West Coast Main Line between Berkhamsted and Wolverton were equipped first, followed by North London Line stations by January 2006. In early 2006, Virgin Trains put a single trial machine in place at a rarely used side entrance to Preston.

By March 2006, about 500 machines had been installed across the British railway network, and Scheidt & Bachmann expected another 500 to be bought in the next year. South West Trains' installation programme, announced in January 2006, started in April 2006 with a single machine at Walton-on-Thames and continued in several stages until mid-2008; it is the largest rollout programme to date. By the end of 2008, only five of the TOC's stations had no Ticket XPress machine. (Note: Beaulieu Road, Holton Heath, Longcross, Millbrook and Redbridge. Permit to Travel machines were installed at these instead.) There are 18 machines at Wimbledon, 22 at Clapham Junction and 32 at London Waterloo: no station has more than this. Meanwhile, the ScotRail network was still a significant customer: Scheidt & Bachmann installed their 1,000th Ticket XPress machine at the TOC's Bridge of Allan railway station in March 2007, and in the same month a service base was opened in Scotland so that engineers could repair machines more quickly.

Two TOCs operated by FirstGroup signed contracts for the installation of Ticket XPress machines in late 2006; machines began to appear at First Capital Connect stations in November 2006—initially at Elephant & Castle and Elstree & Borehamwood stations—and on the First Great Western network soon afterwards (initially at Ealing Broadway). Also in late 2006, Northern Rail started an installation programme. Among the first stations to receive machines were Bolton, Harrogate, Manchester Victoria and Wigan Wallgate. Throughout 2007 and 2008, new installations occurred regularly in all parts of Britain—particularly in southeast England and Scotland—as many TOCs filled in gaps in their provision of machines—both by adding more at their busiest stations and by introducing machines to smaller stations which had no ticket issuing facilities.

The London Midland TOC was created in December 2007 to cover parts of Silverlink's and Central Trains' networks. The new company signed a contract for Scheidt & Bachmann Ticket XPress machines to be installed at its stations; the first was put in at Rowley Regis in February 2008. East Midlands Trains, which began operations around the same time and which also covered some former Central Trains territory, also opted for Ticket XPress machines. The company's first installations were at London St Pancras International, where they replaced Shere FASTticket machines installed by the previous operator Midland Mainline. In late 2008, National Express East Anglia ordered an additional set of machines to supersede all remaining Avantix B8070 machines on its network; and the c2c company ordered 43 Ticket XPress machines for its stations in Essex. Installations began in early October 2008. Merseyrail installed some machines at its unstaffed stations in June 2009 after introducing a penalty fares scheme.

== Machine and ticket features ==
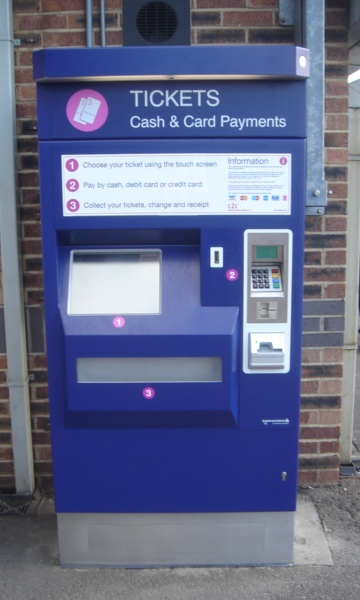
Machines have steel casing and touchscreens at a suitable height for wheelchair users. This example is at Tilbury Town and has the c2c company's livery.

Each Scheidt & Bachmann Ticket XPress machine costs about £30,000 to purchase and install. Machines are 4 1/2 feet (1.4 m) tall and 3 feet (0.91 m) wide. They can have a depth of either 1 1/2 feet (0.46 m) or 1.8 feet (0.55 m) depending on the style of casing, which in either case is built of 0.08-inch (2.0 mm) thick steel with a steel and aluminium door of 0.12-inch (3.0 mm) thickness. A 15-inch (38 cm) transflective liquid-crystal display touchscreen forms the user interface. Early machines had their screens placed too high for wheelchair users, so were not Disability Discrimination Act-compliant. From early 2005, the layout was redesigned so that the screen was lower, and older machines were converted to make them accessible.

Machines have an internal computer running the Windows XP operating system. Various methods of network communication are available, including LAN and ISDN: each machine has a two-way link to central systems administered by the Association of Train Operating Companies (ATOC). Machines can be controlled remotely, revenue data can be extracted overnight (polling) and fare, timetable and station name data can be downloaded to all machines or individual ones on demand. The back office functions are controlled by proprietary software modules designed by Scheidt & Bachmann.

The machines have two printers which can print on, and encode the magnetic stripes on the rear of, Rail Settlement Plan-accredited ticket stock. This has a batch code of RSP No. 9399 and consists of fanfold (concertina-style) packs of round-cornered tickets joined to each other by perforated lugs which are cut during the printing process. An experimental ticket stock with diagonal corners was used in the earliest trial machines. In common with other "New Generation" (post-privatisation) ticket issuing systems, the ticket stock has no pre-printed data other than some conditions on the reverse; all data is printed by the machine. Machines accept either payment cards only or both cards and cash. On the latter, banknotes and coins are checked electronically. Keypads for Chip and PIN card payments were fitted retrospectively on older machines, and as standard on newer machines, when this technology was introduced.

Irrespective of which TOC operates them, machines offer a full range of travel tickets: point-to-point tickets from the home station to all other National Rail destinations, (Note: For comparison, the predecessor Ascom B8050 Quickfare machines offered a maximum of either 40 or 92 destinations, depending on the model; and Avantix B8070 machines held about 200 destinations.) One Day Travelcards, tickets to Transport for London zonal destinations, Plusbus add-ons and weekly season tickets. At some stations, products such as car parking tickets and local rail rovers can also be bought. There were some exceptions in the system's early years though. Early machines were not equipped with Ticket on Departure (ToD) capability, which allows tickets bought online to be collected from a self-service ticket issuing machine at a station. Instead, they were reprogrammed to be ToD-compliant when the feature was introduced, and all machines now offer ToD. The first ToD-equipped machines were at larger stations on the First Great Western network, which were upgraded in summer 2007. At first, the original ScotRail machines installed in early 2004 could not issue new season tickets: only renewals of existing tickets were available. The set of machines operated by the Merseyrail TOC have only ever sold tickets to other Merseyrail stations; and until late 2006 they only sold full-price adult and child tickets. Discounts for concessionary passes such as the 16–25 and Senior Railcards were programmed in at that time.

Tickets are issued on round-cornered stock. All data is printed by the machine.

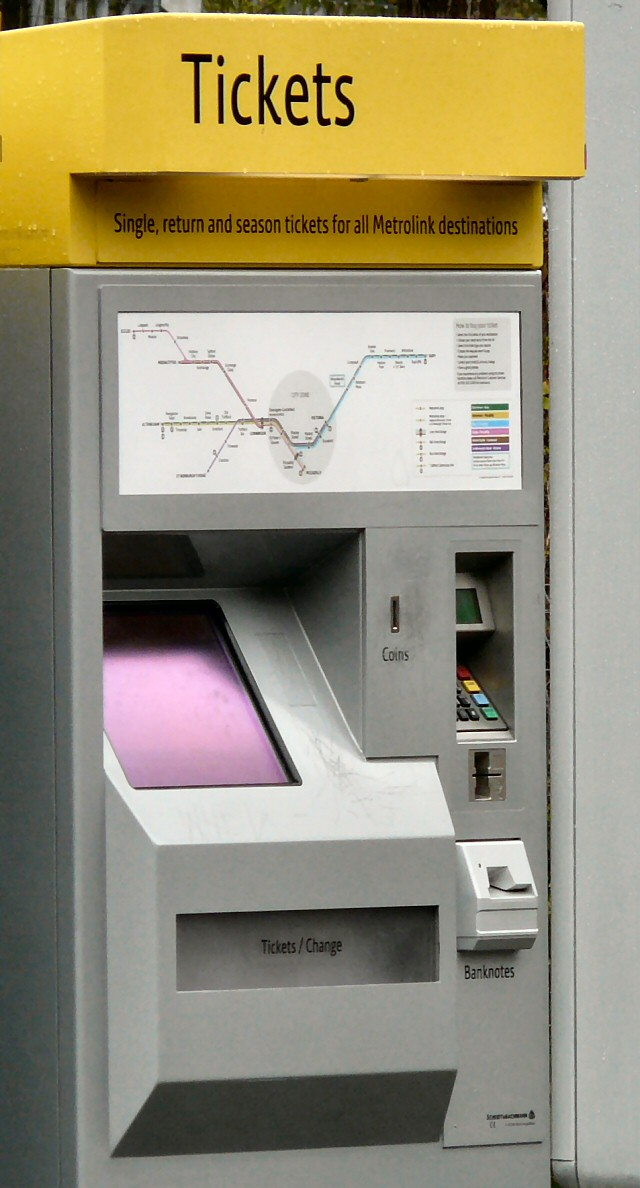
This machine is installed at Stretford station on the Manchester Metrolink system.

Scheidt & Bachmann Ticket XPress tickets conform with many conventions established at the start of the computerised ticketing era. Each machine is assigned a unique four-digit identity number (the "machine number") which is printed on the ticket. Ticket XPress machines started at number 2000 (at Twickenham) and were subsequently numbered in the 2000- and 3000-series. By November 2011, the highest numbered machine was 3632 at Stratford; a year later, when 1,594 machines were in use on the British railway network, number 3717 was the highest. The software controls the machine number; it is not hard-coded. Every ticket issuing location on the railway network is allocated a National Location Code (NLC)—a four-digit code used for accounting and other purposes. (Note: A secondary NLC is assigned to stations which have both ticket office-based and self-service ticket issuing systems. The secondary NLC is shown on tickets issued at the self-service machine(s). This ensures that revenue and costs can be attributed correctly to the two different types of ticket issuing facility.) Each Ticket XPress machine is then assigned to the NLC of its base location, and this is also printed on tickets. Also, a "window number" is allocated to each machine. This sequential number distinguishes it from other machines allocated to the same NLC. Window numbering starts at a different point on each ticket issuing system; on the Scheidt & Bachmann Ticket XPress, the first machine at each location is numbered 21, the second is 22 and so on. Machines at several locations have shown incorrect NLCs or window numbers at various times; for example, upon installation London Waterloo's machines showed Basingstoke's NLC, and at Hampton Wick the Ticket XPress bore the code for Strawberry Hill. Most errors have been corrected quickly and may have been caused by errors in programming during installation.

Almost all Scheidt & Bachmann Ticket XPress machines are located at railway stations, but there is one at Liverpool John Lennon Airport and one at Edinburgh Airport. As of November 2012, 70 machines had been permanently removed. Most of these were at stations in the London area that were formerly part of the Silverlink network (North London Railway) but which passed to London Overground in late 2007: London Overground replaced them with Shere FASTticket machines. The same happened at First Great Western's Ealing Broadway station; in both cases the change happened because Shere FASTticket machines had better support for Oyster card transactions at that time. When King's Cross Thameslink station closed in December 2007, its three First Capital Connect-operated Ticket XPress machines were replaced with four new machines with different numbers at London St Pancras International, whose low-level platforms replaced Kings Cross Thameslink.

== Bibliography ==
- Davis, Matthew (2013). The Future's Green and Orange: Exploring and Explaining Ticketing in the Privatised Rail Industry. Bishops Stortford: The Transport Ticket Society. ISBN 978-0-903209-75-5.
