= Avantix Mobile =

Portable railway ticket issuing system

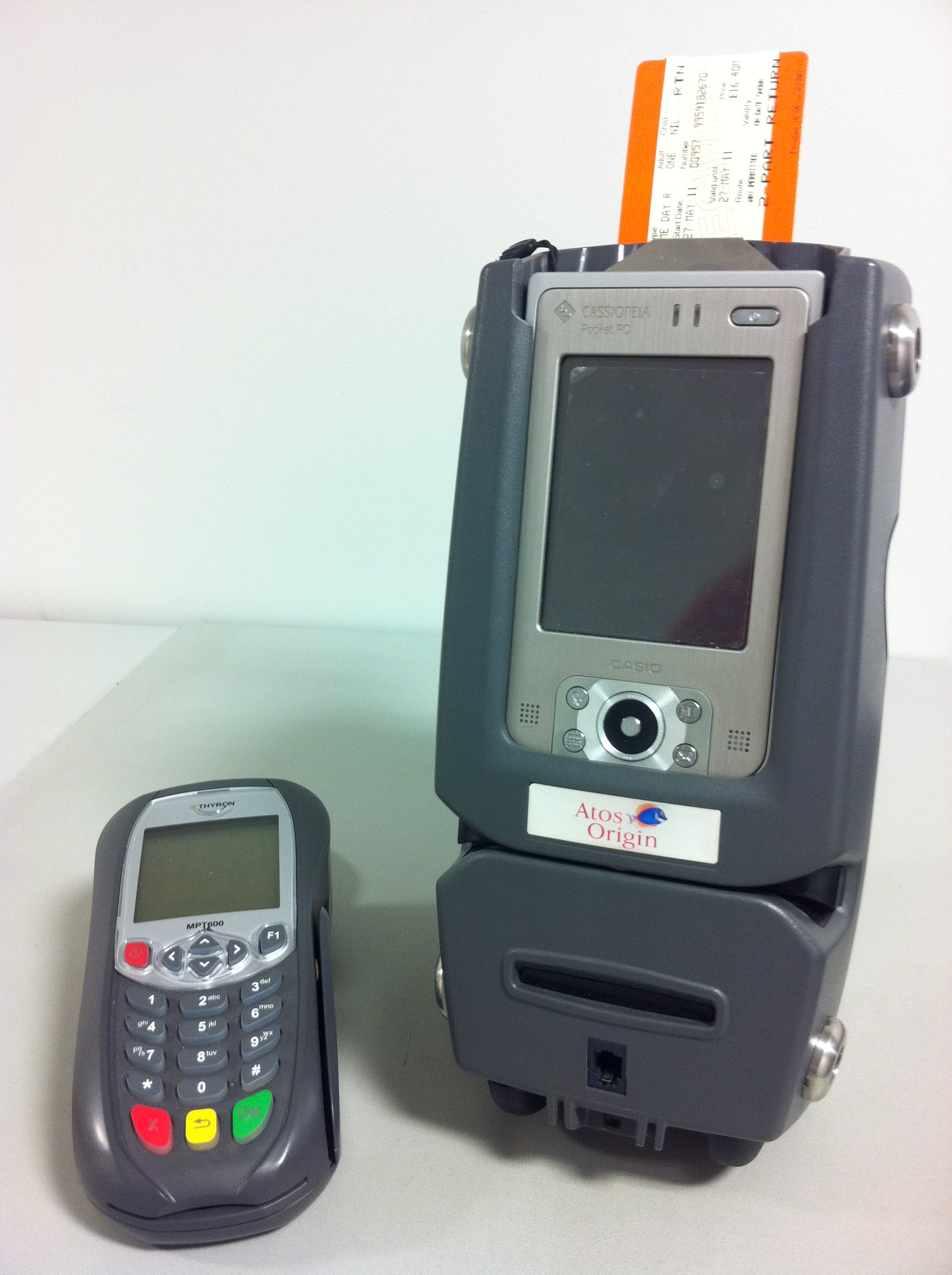

System information
- Full name: Avantix Mobile
- Machine type: Portable (Conductor/Guard-operated)
- Type of ticket stock: Continuous roll or fan-fold
- Manufacturer: Steatite Ltd, Chalgrove, Oxfordshire (manufacturer); Atos (Designer)

History
- First introduced: 2002
- Machine number range: 0002–6106
- Window number range: 70 (Common Stock format only)
- Machines in use: 0

Locations/areas/train operating companies
- Current users: See here

Avantix Mobile ("AVB") was a portable railway ticket issuing system used across the British railway network from 2001 to 2017.

== Development ==
Development started in 2000 by Sema Group plc, as an IT services company which was acquired by Schlumberger Ltd in 2001 and became SchlumbergerSema. The company has since been acquired by France-based IT group Atos, SA. Atos now continues to develop and maintain the system. The first machines were bought and put into use by train operating companies (TOCs) in 2002. By late 2005, market penetration had reached 80%, and as of 2007 SPORTIS has been superseded completely.

The Avantix Mobile system was designed for the Sema Group plc by Printer Systems Limited this included the technique of printing and encoding the magnetic stripe at the same time, the Z-fold ticket pack and the electronic control system with interface to a Casio PDA. The Avantix Mobile housing was designed, developed and engineered by Hyphen Design Ltd, of London. Particular design and engineering challenges were a tamper-resistant PDA retention and ejection mechanism, and a secure loading door latch, to prevent the device spilling ticket stock or batteries if dropped. Hyphen design Design also developed a cartridge design for holding Z-fold or fan-fold ticket stock. With the horizontally mounted cartridge, a stack of 3 or more of the fan-fold stock could easily be drawn into the print head and jam it. The solution was a pad of fine silicone rubber fingers, stuck to the top and bottom internal surfaces of the cartridge, to provide enough grip on the uneven ticket stack, without putting too much load on the print head.

Avantix Mobile was the successor to the SPORTIS system which had been developed in the mid-1980s for British Rail. SPORTIS was the first fully computerized portable ticketing system for use by on-train staff and Revenue Protection Inspectors, and in other situations, where mobile ticket-issuing facilities are required. However, by 2002, the machines themselves were up to 15 years old, with their underlying technology being several years older, and they lacked the storage capacity for the increasing variety of fares and promotions available on the post-privatisation British railway system.

Avantix Mobile machines were first adopted by TOCs owned at the time by National Express; however, they later became used across all National Rail-controlled TOCs with the exception of Merseyrail who continued to issue paper tickets until TVMs had been installed at the last few stations on the Wirral line, which did not have any ticket issuing facilities.

Arriva Trains Wales announced in January 2016 that their Avantix machines would be withdrawn after March 2016. The replacement machines would produce paper tickets with no magnetic stripe; instead they would carry a bar code which could be read by National Rail ticket barriers. As they were not compatible with barriers on the London Underground, they would not be accepted for cross-London services on the Underground even if it would normally have been included in the fare. A pilot scheme would operate on Cardiff local services, however, the tickets issued would not be valid on services operated by other companies.

== Ticket stock ==
Whereas the former SPORTIS system was only able to print non-magnetically-encoded tickets on paper rolls, Avantix Mobile could produce tickets in this format and with magnetic stripe encoding on card tickets with a magnetic stripe. Paper tickets were provided in rolls of 450; card stock came in "fan-fold" packs of 250 (however, roll-stock is no longer used as magnetically encoded card stock has become the Rail Settlement Plan standard).

Magnetically encoded tickets have the advantage of being able to operate the automatic ticket gates which are used at a large number of National Rail stations throughout Britain, as well as at the majority of London Underground stations.

Paper roll tickets carried the Rail Settlement Plan form number RSP 3594: the same as on post-privatization SPORTIS tickets, as SPORTIS used the same blank stock. Gatwick Express has used dedicated stock, RSP 3594/GA, with a red colour scheme and security background (RSP 3594 is orange with a pale green background). Three types of card stock had been used: two versions with the form number RSP 3599, and one numbered RSP 9299. On the first version of RSP 3599, each ticket had diagonally cut-off corners, but this later changed to rounded corners as is standard on most other ticket issuing systems. Both of these types had pre-printed headings. With the move to "Common Stock" ticketing, where all information is printed by the machine, RSP 9299 stock with no pre-printed headings were introduced. These tickets had rounded corners.

== System description ==
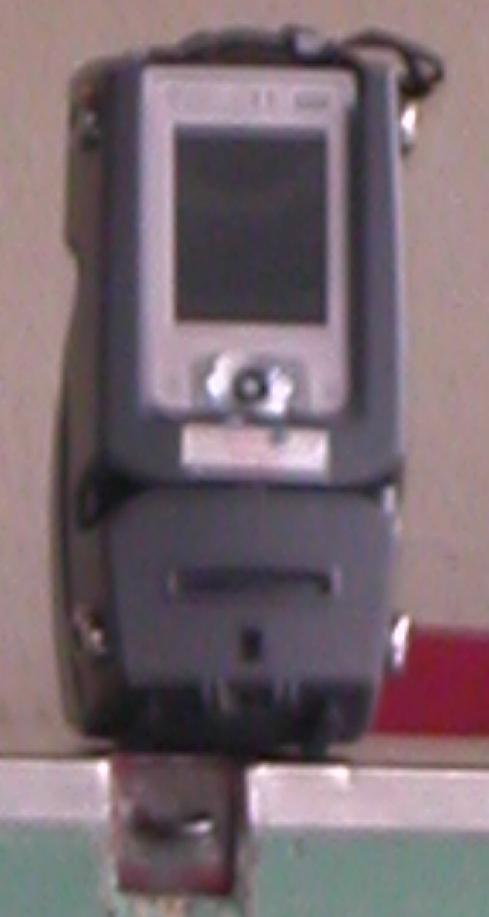
An Avantix Mobile machine used on a ticket barrier

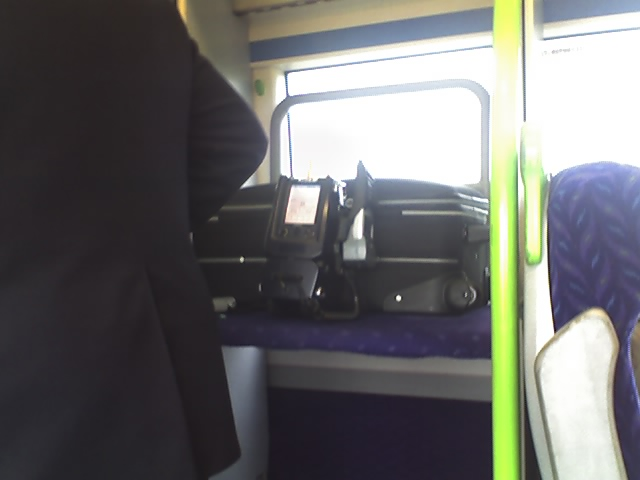
An Avantix Mobile machine used on board a train

The machine consisted of a specialized PDA device, upon which all fare, timetable and other data was stored, a small ticket printer and its batteries, the blank ticket stock, and a ticket cradle which held the tickets when they had been printed. The printer and ticket stock were housed within a plastic case into which the PDA slid.

Including the plastic casing, an Avantix Mobile machine was 262mm tall, 126mm wide and had a depth of 175mm. Total weight including batteries, a full set of ticket stock, and the padded shoulder strap was 2.03kg. Thermal printing was used, with a magnetically encoded ticket typically taking 3 1/2 seconds to print. The printer used two lithium-ion batteries which were charged in standard charging trays.

AVB issued tickets on magnetically encoded common ticket stock. The thermally printed tickets emerged from the top of the printer.

There were three options for credit-card acceptance:

- A Gemalto Magic 1100 Chip & PIN reader could be plugged into the printer
- A VeriFone Xplorer terminal could be used with Bluetooth connectivity to the IT-10 PDA
- A Thyron MPT600 terminal could be used with Bluetooth connectivity to the IT-10 PDA

For passengers who did not have a Chip and PIN or Chip and Signature payment card, credit card payments were processed by a swipe slot in the Avantix casing which read the magnetic stripe of the card and required the buyer to sign a card receipt. This magnetic read head could also be used to swipe suitable magnetic tickets and would tell the user if the ticket had been through a ticket barrier.

The PDA worked as a touch screen instrument using either a stylus or finger.

The fares and timetable information on the PDA was stored on a memory card. Updates were downloaded when the PDA was in a docking station.

All fares were on AVB although advance purchase tickets could not be sold as generally these required seat reservations. Only weekly season tickets could be sold. Monthly and annual prices could be looked up by going to the season enquiry menu. All types of Railcard discounts, local council discount schemes and other concessions were loaded on to an AVB. Plusbus tickets and rover tickets could also be sold along with certain ferry and bus through ticketing. AVB could handle both CRS station short codes and National Location Codes (NLCs); but if the user did not know either code, typing in the station name would bring the fares up.

Timetable information could be accessed by using the timetable enquiry facility. Whilst using the timetable enquiry screen, highlighting the start and end of one leg of the train journey and choosing select will then show where that train started and every planned stop, with the times right through to the journey's end.

Multiple ticket issues could be done using the shopping basket facility so that many tickets could all be grouped together in the shopping basket and sold as one transaction.

The user could issue group tickets on to one ticket rather than printing off multiple tickets.

The last 16 issues facility showed last 16 tickets issued.

AVB also came loaded with a popular products function where a code was entered a screen with the most popular fares for a route would be displayed. This saved the user typing in the origin, destination and ticket type as popular products enabled the user to hit one button on one screen rather than going through 3–4 screens.

Cash, Rail Travel Vouchers, Rail Warrants (traders' and armed forces), cheques (in some cases), National Transport Tokens, and Visa, Mastercard and American Express credit/debit cards were all accepted payments for AVB users. Visa Electron and International Maestro cards were not accepted on any portable equipment due to the need for online authorization. (They are accepted at many train operating companies' ticket counters.) Cards that were programmed to always require on-line authorization may also have not been accepted.

Incident enquiry screen showed printer and PDA battery life as well as any non-issued tickets.

AVB could be secured by the user setting a code word to prevent misuse.

== Users ==
- Abellio Greater Anglia (including Stansted Express)
- Abellio ScotRail
- Arriva Trains Wales
- c2c
- Chiltern Railways
- CrossCountry
- East Midlands Trains
- Grand Central
- Great Northern
- Great Western Railway
- Hull Trains
- London Midland
- London Overground
- Northern
- Southern (including Gatwick Express)
- Southeastern
- South West Trains (including Island Line Trains)
- Thameslink
- TransPennine Express
- Virgin Trains
- Virgin Trains East Coast
