= Ascom EasyTicket =

British railway ticket issuing system

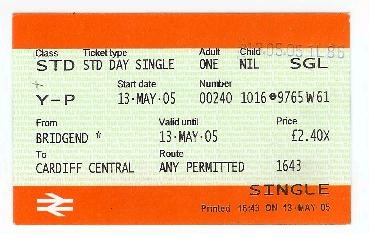

System information
- Full name: Ascom EasyTicket TIS9000
- Machine type: Self-service machine
- Type of ticket stock: Continuous roll
- Manufacturer: Ascom Transport Revenue

History
- First introduced: March 2003
- Machine number range: 1001-1016; 5001-5003
- Window number range: Upwards from 61
- Machines in use: 7

Locations/areas/train operating companies
- Current users: Gatwick Express
- Former users: Southern; South West Trains; Central Trains; Arriva Trains Wales; Chiltern Railways; First Capital Connect

The Ascom EasyTicket is a railway ticket issuing system used in Britain, consisting of a series of self-service (passenger-operated) machines at railway stations. Having been introduced in 2003 on a trial basis by several Train Operating Companies (TOCs) at various stations, the system did not spread into common usage, and most machines have since been removed.

== Company details ==
Ascom AG was created in 1987 through a merger between three major telecommunications companies in Switzerland, although its origins can ultimately be traced back to the establishment of the Swiss Federal Telegraph Workshops in 1852. The Autelca AG division, which had been acquired in 1963 by one of Ascom AG's constituent companies, was involved in the manufacture of ticket vending machines (TVMs); it provided British Rail with the B8050 self-service machine, hundreds of which were installed at stations across Britain from 1989 onwards.

The EasyTicket system was developed while the Transport Revenue division, as it was then known, was still under Ascom's ownership; but as part of an attempt to focus on the telecommunications sector, the division was sold in August 2005 to Affiliated Computer Services, Inc for 130 million Swiss Francs.

== Origins ==
The company's first attempt to move on from the successful B8050 machine was the B8070, a small evolutionary upgrade initially developed and delivered in 1999. In the meantime, however, a more significant, revolutionary design solution was being sought: Ascom realised that the late-1980s B8050 technology was no longer suitable for the modern railway environment, given the increasing use of credit and other payment cards, the anticipated adoption of the Chip and PIN secure-payments system, new disability regulations and the effects privatisation had on fragmenting and expanding the fare structure on Britain's railways.

The EasyTicket system (official code number TIS9000) was developed with these considerations in mind, and features:

- Two different machine heights, with one having a specially lowered screen, coin/card slots and ticket dispenser suitable for wheelchair users
- Touch-screen technology with a series of sub-menus
- Instructions in six different languages, selectable at the start of the transaction process
- Cash-and-card and card-only models

== Installation programme ==
Machines began to be installed on a trial basis in March 2003, with a single machine (low-height, cash-and-card version) at Gatwick Airport station. More followed, as shown: (Train Operating Company names are those current at the time of installation)

Train Operating Company	Location	Machine Number	Type	Date	Outcome of trial
Gatwick Express	Gatwick Airport	1001	Cash and card	March 2003	Still in situ; see below
South West Trains	Haslemere	1008	Cash and card	April 2003	Removed January 2004
South West Trains	Wokingham	5001	Card only	April 2003	Replaced by Shere FASTticket machine
Chiltern Railways	London Marylebone	1012	Cash and card	June 2003	Replaced by Shere FASTticket machine
South Central Trains	East Croydon	1009	Cash and card	August 2003	Replaced by Shere FASTticket machine
Central Trains	Loughborough (Leics.)	1013	Cash and card	August 2003	Replaced by Scheidt & Bachmann Ticket XPress machine
South Central Trains	Haywards Heath	5002	Card only	September 2003	Replaced by Shere FASTticket machine
Thameslink	King's Cross Thameslink	1010	Cash and card	November 2003	Replaced by Scheidt & Bachmann Ticket XPress machine
Thameslink	Elstree & Borehamwood	1011	Cash and card	December 2003	Replaced by Scheidt & Bachmann Ticket XPress machine
South Central Trains	East Croydon	5003	Card only	2004	Replaced by Shere FASTticket machine
Arriva Trains Wales	Bridgend	1016	Cash and card	May 2005	Replaced by Scheidt & Bachmann Ticket XPress machine

Following the trial at Gatwick Airport, Gatwick Express, the Train Operating Company responsible for providing ticketing facilities at Gatwick Airport and London Victoria, elected to install an additional five at the former and one at the latter. There were previously six Ascom B8050 machines at Gatwick Airport, so this turned out to be a like-for-like replacement. The machine at London Victoria is close to the Gatwick Express ticket office windows on the dedicated Express platforms; there were two B8050 machines there until around 1991.
