= Liverpool railway station =

Liverpool railway station may refer to:

== Liverpool, England ==
- Liverpool Central railway station in Liverpool, England
  - Liverpool Central High Level railway station in Liverpool, England (closed)
- Liverpool Lime Street railway station in Liverpool, England
- Liverpool James Street railway station in Liverpool, England
- Liverpool South Parkway railway station in Liverpool, England
- Liverpool St James railway station in Liverpool, England (closed)
- Liverpool Exchange railway station in Liverpool, England (closed)
- Liverpool Riverside railway station in Liverpool, England (closed)
- Liverpool Great Howard Street railway station in Liverpool, England (closed)
- Liverpool Crown Street railway station in Liverpool, England (closed)
- Liverpool Baltic railway station in Liverpool, England (planned)

== Other ==
- Liverpool railway station, Sydney, Australia
- London Liverpool Street railway station in London, England

== See also ==
- Liverpool station group, ticketing group of stations in Liverpool, England
