= Station group =

A station group may refer to:

- Station group (railway), a system in which nearby railway stations are grouped together under a single ticketed destination
- Duopoly (broadcasting), also called a station group, where groups of nearby radio stations have the same ownership
