= Station group (railway) =

Nearby rail stations ticketed together

In the ticketing system of the British rail network, tickets are normally issued to and from individual stations. In some instances, when there is more than one station in a town or other locality—especially where these are on different routes—it may be desirable for passengers to be able to travel to one station and back from another, or more generally to be able to choose which of the stations they wish to travel to. To accommodate this requirement, British Rail introduced a series of station groups: notional "common locations" to which tickets from stations outside that group would be issued.

For example, Penge in South London has two stations: Penge East and Penge West. The former is served by trains from London Victoria to Orpington; the latter is on the route from London Bridge to West Croydon. For a traveller arriving at, for example, a London terminal station and intending to go to Penge, it makes little difference which route is chosen. Both stations are close together and serve the same area. Therefore, a ticket issued specifically to one of the Penge stations would be unduly restrictive—it would remove the opportunity to travel by a choice of equally convenient routes. A notional "Penge group" solves this problem: a ticket issued in this way would be interavailable.

The concept is explained in the National Fares Manuals (NFMs) issued approximately three times per year by the British Railways Board (and, since privatisation, by the Association of Train Operating Companies) to stations, Rail Appointed Travel Agents and other ticket issuing authorities: "Fares for certain ... cities and towns are shown to and from a notional common station[.] All fares are quoted and all tickets should be issued to and from [these notional group] stations except for local journeys between two stations in the same group. Tickets issued to and from these [notional group] stations are valid to or from any of their associated stations, subject to normal route availability."

== Terminology and appearance on tickets ==
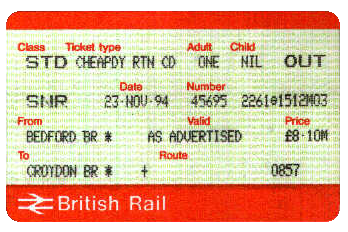
An APTIS ticket issued for travel between the "Bedford Group" and the "Croydon Group", showing the pre-privatisation designations BEDFORD BR and CROYDON BR.

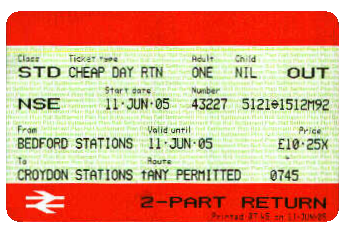
A Shere SMART ticket issued for the same journey, showing the post-privatisation designations BEDFORD STATIONS and CROYDON STATIONS.

These "locations" had to be shown in a standard, easily identifiable way on tickets. The method chosen by the British Railways Board was as follows:

- Take the name of the actual location where the stations are: for Penge East and Penge West, PENGE.
- Add the suffix BR to this: PENGE BR.

Each station group was also allocated its own National Location Code (NLC)—a four-digit code used for accounting and to attribute revenue to locations on the railway network. Most station group codes were between 0250 and 0500. This NLC appeared on PORTIS/SPORTIS tickets, which by convention always showed the "origin" and "destination" NLCs as well as the code of the issuing point; but tickets from the APTIS system and its replacements always showed the NLC of the actual station of issue, even where a ticket was issued from a "station group" (except for some short-lived anomalies).

After privatisation, the designation "BR" was no longer appropriate, although having been in use for more than 10 years it had become a convenient shorthand device for referring to the station groups concept in general (for example, National Fares Manuals continued to use the term "BR Stations"). A new designation had to be created which still took up little space on a ticket (location names are restricted to 16 characters on most ticket issuing systems) and which still conveyed a notion of interavailability.

The solution, introduced gradually from November 1997 and uploaded to all ticket issuing systems by January 1998, was for BR to be changed to STNS or STATIONS as appropriate:

- STNS if the location name was between 8 and 11 characters in length: for example, LIVERPOOL BR became LIVERPOOL STNS.
- STATIONS if the location name was 7 characters or fewer: for example, DORKING BR became DORKING STATIONS.

There were some deviations from this standard:

- As GAINSBOROUGH is 12 characters in length, a meaningful abbreviation to signify the station grouping could not be created. As a result the Gainsborough group is simply shown as GAINSBOROUGH.
- As GLASGOW STATIONS could have been mistakenly interpreted by passengers as referring to the whole of the Glasgow suburban rail network, it was used only briefly before being changed in mid-April 1998 to GLASGOW CEN/QST, specifically representing Glasgow Central and Glasgow Queen Street stations.

Additionally, the London group is treated as a special case. It was created in April 1970 by BR's Southern Region as a grouping of their nine terminal stations named LONDON S.R., before being expanded in May 1983 to include all BR terminals under the name LONDON BR, and then LONDON BRIT RAIL from January 1989 until 1997. Rather than receiving the standard new name of LONDON STATIONS it was referred to simply as LONDON before becoming LONDON TERMINALS in April 1998, even though four of the eighteen stations included in the group are not technically termini.

== Existing groups ==
As of January 2017, 38 station groups (including the London group) are known to exist. The table shows the NLC allocated to each group, the pre- and post-privatisation renderings of the group name, and the stations included within it.

Current name	Former name	NLC	Stations Included	Notes	Refs
BEDFORD STATIONS	BEDFORD BR	0410	Bedford, Bedford St Johns		
BICESTER NTH/VIL	—	7934	Bicester North, Bicester Village	The most recently created group, dating from 28 July 2015	
BIRMINGHAM STNS	BIRMINGHAM BR	0418	Birmingham Moor Street, Birmingham New Street, Birmingham Snow Hill	Birmingham Snow Hill was included from January 1988 following the reopening of the station.	
BOOTLE STATIONS	—	1780	Bootle New Strand, Bootle Oriel Road	Introduced 26 September 1999.	
BRADFORD YK STNS	BRADFORD YKS BR	0424	Bradford Forster Square, Bradford Interchange		
CANTERBURY STNS	CANTERBURY BR	0428	Canterbury East, Canterbury West		
CATFORD STATIONS	CATFORD BR	0258	Catford, Catford Bridge		
COLCHESTER STNS	COLCHESTER BR	0254	Colchester, Colchester Town	Introduced in May 1991.	
CROYDON STATIONS	CROYDON BR	0449	East Croydon, West Croydon	Tickets are valid to and from South Croydon as well, but tickets issued at South Croydon show that name.	
DORCHESTER STNS	DORCHESTER BR	0429	Dorchester South, Dorchester West		
DORKING STATIONS	DORKING BR	0416	Dorking, Dorking Deepdene, Dorking West		
EDENBRIDGE STNS	EDENBRIDGE BR	0259	Edenbridge, Edenbridge Town		
ENFIELD STATIONS	ENFIELD BR	0263	Enfield Chase, Enfield Town	Enfield Lock has never been included.	
FALKIRK STATIONS	FALKIRK BR	0431	Falkirk Grahamston, Falkirk High		
FARNBOROUGH STNS	FARNBOROUGH BR	0260	Farnborough (Main), Farnborough North		
FOLKESTONE STNS	FOLKESTONE BR	0432	Folkestone Central, Folkestone West	Folkestone Harbour was included until closure in 2001.	
GAINSBOROUGH	GAINSBOROUGH BR	0415	Gainsborough Central, Gainsborough Lea Road		
GLASGOW CEN/QST	GLASGOW BR	0433	Glasgow Central, Glasgow Queen Street	Occasionally seen as GLASGOW STATIONS in 1998; officially renamed GLASGOW CEN/QST from 27 September 1998.	
HELENSBURGH STNS	HELENSBURGH BR	0404	Helensburgh Central, Helensburgh Upper		
HERTFORD STNS	HERTFORD BR	0413	Hertford East, Hertford North		
LIVERPOOL STNS	LIVERPOOL BR	0435	Liverpool Central, Liverpool James Street, Liverpool Lime Street, Moorfields		
LONDON TERMINALS	LONDON BR	1072	Blackfriars, Cannon Street, Charing Cross, City Thameslink, Euston, Fenchurch Street, King's Cross, Liverpool Street, London Bridge, Marylebone, Moorgate, Old Street, Paddington, St Pancras, Vauxhall, Victoria, Waterloo, Waterloo East		
LONDON THAMESLINK	—	4452	Blackfriars, City Thameslink, Euston, London Bridge, St Pancras, Farringdon, Kentish Town, Elephant & Castle		
MAIDSTONE STNS	MAIDSTONE BR	0437	Maidstone Barracks, Maidstone East, Maidstone West		
MANCHESTER STNS	MANCHESTER BR	0438	Deansgate, Manchester Oxford Road, Manchester Piccadilly, Manchester Victoria	Deansgate and Salford Central were included in the group until January 1989. By 2005, Deansgate was included again. MANCHESTER CTLZ includes the same stations and also Manchester Metrolink Central Zone tram stations.	
NEWARK STATIONS	NEWARK BR	0441	Newark Castle, Newark North Gate		
PENGE STATIONS	PENGE BR	0262	Penge East, Penge West		
PONTEFRACT STNS	PONTEFRACT BR	0268	Pontefract Baghill, Pontefract Monkhill	Pontefract Tanshelf was included in the group from September 1997, but by 2005 was no longer included.	
PORTSMOUTH STNS	PORTSMOUTH BR	0440	Portsmouth & Southsea, Portsmouth Harbour	Fratton was included in the group until October 1988.	
READING STATIONS	READING BR	0403	Reading, Reading West	Tilehurst was included in the group until October 1988.	
SOUTHEND STNS	SOUTHEND BR	0411	Southend Central, Southend Victoria	Southend East is no longer included in this group.	
THORNE STATIONS	THORNE BR	0271	Thorne North, Thorne South		
TILBURY STATIONS	TILBURY BR	7468	Tilbury Riverside, Tilbury Town	Introduced in January 1993. East Tilbury has never been included. Tilbury Riverside closed to rail services in 1993, but c2c provide a minibus service between Tilbury Town and the former station to provide a connection with the ferry to Gravesend.	
TYNDRUM STATIONS	TYNDRUM BR	0443	Tyndrum Lower, Upper Tyndrum		
WAKEFIELD STNS	WAKEFIELD BR	0444	Wakefield Kirkgate, Wakefield Westgate		
WARRINGTON STNS	WARRINGTON BR	0445	Warrington Bank Quay, Warrington Central		
W HAMPSTEAD STNS	WEST HAMPSTD BR	0265	West Hampstead, West Hampstead Thameslink		
WIGAN STATIONS	WIGAN BR	0446	Wigan North Western, Wigan Wallgate		
WORCESTER STNS	WORCESTER BR	0447	Worcester Foregate Street, Worcester Shrub Hill	Droitwich Spa was included in the group until October 1988.	

== Defunct groups ==
The following table contains groups which have been used at some time between 1985 and the present, but which are not currently in use.

Name	NLC	Active From	Withdrawn From	Stations Included	Notes	Refs
ARDROSSAN BR	0423		January 1989	Ardrossan Harbour, Ardrossan South Beach, Ardrossan Town	Ardrossan Town reopened in 1987 and was included in the group from May 1988.	
BIRKENHEAD BR	0266		May 1994	Birkenhead Central, Birkenhead Hamilton Square, Birkenhead Park		
BLACKPOOL BR	0426		May 1994	Blackpool North, Blackpool South	Blackpool Pleasure Beach was included in the group during the period of validity of NFM 39 (May 1988 to October 1988).	
BRIGHTON BR	0257		January 1989	Aldrington, Brighton, Hove, London Road (Brighton), Moulsecoomb, Preston Park		
BRISTOL BR	0400		January 1989	Bedminster, Bristol Parkway, Bristol Temple Meads, Filton, Keynsham, Lawrence Hill, Parson Street, Stapleton Road	"Filton" refers to the original Filton station, which was subsequently closed and replaced by Filton Abbey Wood nearby.	
BURNLEY BR	0427		May 1994	Burnley Barracks, Burnley Central, Burnley Manchester Road	Rose Grove was included in the group until January 1989.	
CARDIFF BR	0401		January 1995	Cardiff Bute Road, Cardiff Central, Cardiff Queen Street	Cardiff Bute Road was subsequently renamed Cardiff Bay. Cathays was included in the group until January 1989.	
DOVER BR	0414		January 1995	Dover Priory, Dover Western Docks		
EDINBURGH BR	0255			Edinburgh Waverley, Haymarket		
EXETER BR	0430		May 1992	Exeter Central, Exeter St Davids, Exeter St Thomas	St James Park was included in the group until NFM 41 (January 1989).	
GREENOCK BR	0434		January 1989	Greenock Central, Greenock West		
GUILDFORD BR	0256			Guildford, London Road (Guildford)		
HAMILTON BR	0405		January 1989	Hamilton Central, Hamilton West		
HARTFORD BR	0267			Greenbank, Hartford		
HILLINGTON BR	0406		January 1989	Hillington East, Hillington West		
LICHFIELD BR	0399	May 1989	September 1989	Lichfield City, Lichfield Trent Valley	This grouping was introduced in NFM 42 (May 1989), but was withdrawn at the next fares change because of the difficulty in allocating revenue correctly between the InterCity and Regional Railways sectors.	
LINCOLN BR			May 1985	Lincoln Central, Lincoln St. Marks	The group NLC is unknown. "Withdrawn from" date is the closure date of Lincoln St. Marks station.	
LYMINGTON BR	0436		May 1989	Lymington Pier, Lymington Town		
NEWBURY BR	0498			Newbury, Newbury Racecourse		
NEWHAVEN BR	0439		October 1988	Newhaven Harbour, Newhaven Marine, Newhaven Town	Newhaven Marine station was in limited use for ferry passengers only.	
NEW MILLS BR	0412			New Mills Central, New Mills Newtown		
PLYMOUTH BR	0402		January 1989	Devonport, Dockyard, Keyham, Plymouth, St Budeaux Ferry Road, St Budeaux Victoria Road		
ROTHERHAM BR	0270	11 May 1987	3 October 1988	Rotherham Central, Rotherham Masborough	The dates are, respectively, the opening date of Rotherham Central and the closing date of Rotherham Masborough.	
RYDE BR	0272	May 1988	January 1989	Ryde Esplanade, Ryde St John's Road	Ryde Pier Head was not included.	
ST HELENS BR	0264		October 1988	St Helens Junction, St Helens Shaw Street	St Helens Shaw Street was subsequently renamed St Helens Central.	
STREATHAM BR	0261		January 1989	Streatham, Streatham Common, Streatham Hill		
TUNBDGE WELLS BR	0442		6 July 1985	Tunbridge Wells Central, Tunbridge Wells West	Tunbridge Wells Central was subsequently renamed Tunbridge Wells. "Withdrawn from" date is the closure date of Tunbridge Wells West station.	
WORTHING BR	0499			East Worthing, West Worthing, Worthing		
WREXHAM BR	0417		May 1994	Wrexham Central, Wrexham General	Sometimes shown as WREXHAM CLWYD BR.	
YEOVIL BR	0448			Yeovil Junction, Yeovil Pen Mill		

== The status of individual stations within groups ==
The station group concept only applied to point-to-point travel tickets and tickets directly related to these, such as Season Tickets and Excess Tickets. Other types of ticket issued at a station within a group would show the name of the station itself - selected examples are:

- One Day Travelcards in the London area
- Platform Tickets
- Car Park Tickets
- Rail Rovers and Rangers

Also, for a ticket issued for travel between one station in a group and another, the individual stations' names are shown. This only has practical relevance in situations where group stations are easily accessible from each other - for example, the Liverpool group, where all four stations can be reached directly from each of the others.

== In other countries ==
Station groupings are also used on transport networks in other countries, though not necessarily to the same extent as in the UK.

=== Australia ===
Tickets issued by Victorian regional train and coach operator V/Line for travel to Melbourne city are issued to the group MELBOURNE Z1+2, indicating Myki Zones 1 and 2, and therefore including all stations on the Melbourne suburban rail network as well as all bus and tram services within those zones.

=== Germany ===
Rail tickets in Germany can be issued to station groups in many cities, referred to as Zielbahnhöfe mit tariflicher Gleichstellung (in effect, "destination stations with equal fares"), so long as the total travel distance for the ticket is greater than the threshold set for each city. For example, the BERLIN group includes all main-line and S-Bahn stations on and within the Berlin Ringbahn, and has a threshold distance of 100 kilometres (62 mi).
