= Scheidt & Bachmann =

German manufacturer of equipment for the transportation industry

Scheidt & Bachmann GmbH
- Type: Private
- Industry: Transportation; Technology
- Founded: 1872; 154 years ago Mönchengladbach, Germany
- Headquarters: Mönchengladbach, Germany
- Website: scheidt-bachmann.de

Scheidt & Bachmann GmbH is a German multinational diversified manufacturing company, based in Mönchengladbach, North Rhine-Westphalia. It produces railway signalling systems, ticketing and fare collection equipment for public transport, parking facility management systems, and fuel retail equipment.

== History ==
Friedrich Scheidt and Carl Bachmann founded Scheidt & Bachmann in Mönchengladbach in 1872, initially manufacturing steam engines and textile manufacturing equipment. In 1875, production expanded to create mechanical signals for railroad systems. 1896, Scheidt & Badmann was granted its first patent for a "drive device for barriers". The company relocated to a larger facility in Rheydt (now part of Mönchengladbach) in 1914. In 1932, it took advantage of the favourable market situation, and expanded into the manufacture of tank systems and petrol pumps.

In 1936 the company was transformed from a general partnership (Offene Handelsgesellschaft or 'oHG') into a public liability company (Aktiengesellschaft or 'AG'). During World War II, the main factory was almost completely destroyed prompting reconstructuion efforts after the end of the war.

In the 1950s and 60s, Scheidt & Bachmann AG operated an iron foundry and produced equipment such as tank systems, compressors, gas and petrol pumps, and signaling devices. In 1956, the company pursued a licensing agreement with a U.S. firm to manufacture oil burners. During this period, a significant portion of its products was sold to the German Federal Railway and various international oil companies.

In 1963, Scheidt & Bachmann AG changed its legal status from a public limited company to a limited liability company (GmbH). By 1966, the company began designing and producing systems for multi-storey car parks, launching its parking management division and incorporating emerging microprocessor technology. Around the same time, Scheidt & Bachmann developed parking fee-collection systems featuring barriers at parking lot entrances, where users could obtain magnetic tickets or use credit cards to enter and pay at self-service or staffed cashier stations, with fees calculated upon exit. In 1970, the company expanded this concept to include fare collection systems for public transportation. The business was further expanded in 1974 to include systems for leisure centres, followed by the establishment of a fare collection systems division in 1978. In 1990 the company acquired Verkehrselektronik GmbH, which became the first wholly owned subsidiary.

In 2008, Scheidt & Bachmann ticket machines on the Long Island Rail Road and the Metro-North Railroad in the New York metropolitan area were highlighted in the media after US$800,000 worth of tickets were dispensed for free and fraudulently resold. A glitch in the ticket machines dispensed free tickets when debit card transactions from certain banks were supposed to decline. The glitch had been present since 2001, and was exploited by a group of three people who resold the tickets for over three years.

A 2012 audit of the CharlieCard system on the MBTA in Boston, maintained by Scheidt & Bachmann, found a discrepancy of US$101.7 million in fare revenues over five years. The audit also found that ticket machines and fareboxes had been unable to communicate with the MBTA's accounting systems since the CharlieCard system's 2005 installation.

Over the years, the company has become a system supplier of intelligent mobility solutions and has been able to expand its market share. In 1995, the first subsidiaries were set up in the US and Slovakia. Numerous other subsidiaries were established worldwide in the years that followed. In 2017, Scheidt & Bachmann began to offer cloud solutions, because faster data lines made cloud-bass systems feasible.

== Products ==
=== Fare collection ===
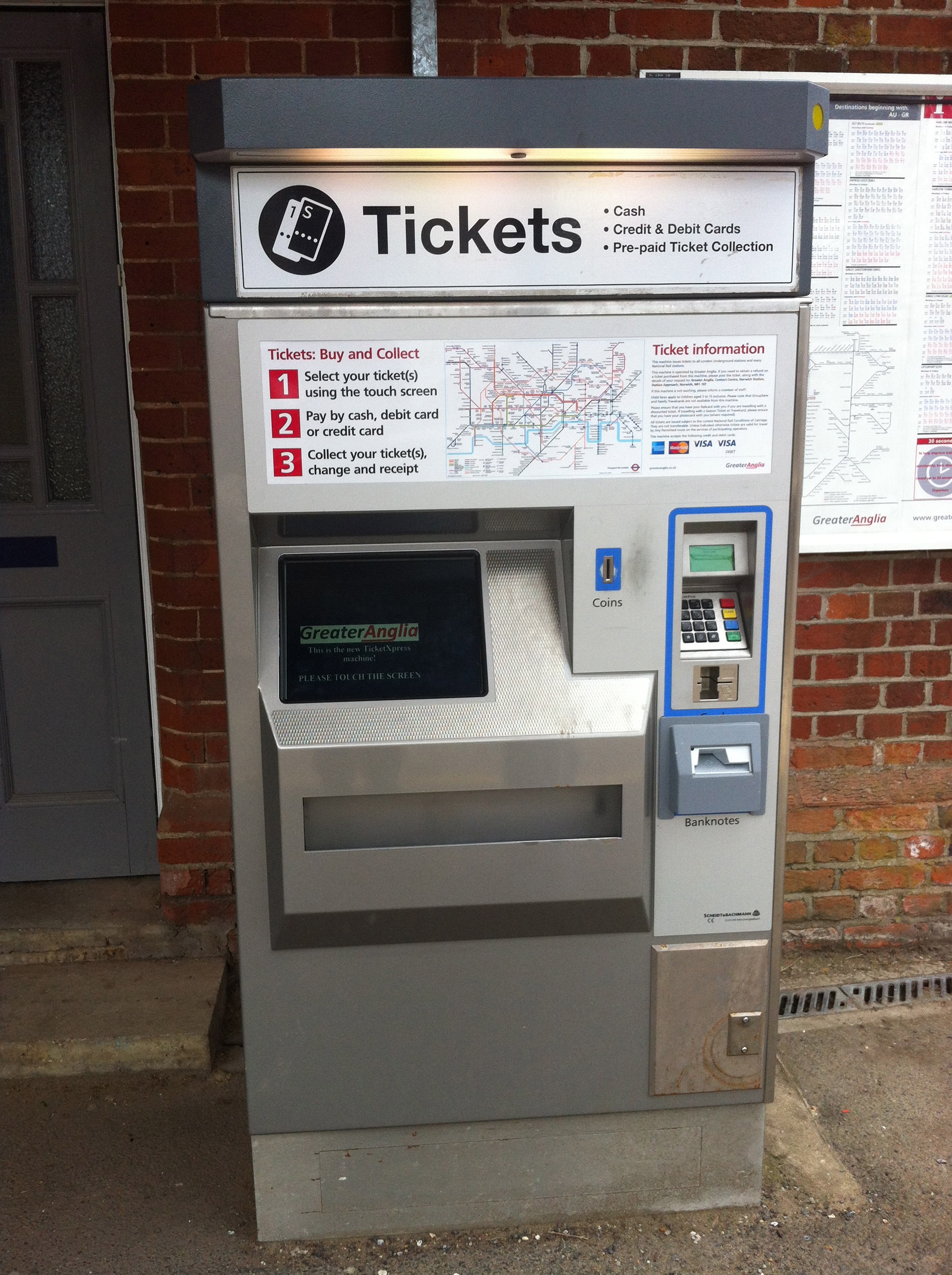
Scheidt & Bachmann ticket machine at a Greater Anglia railway station in England

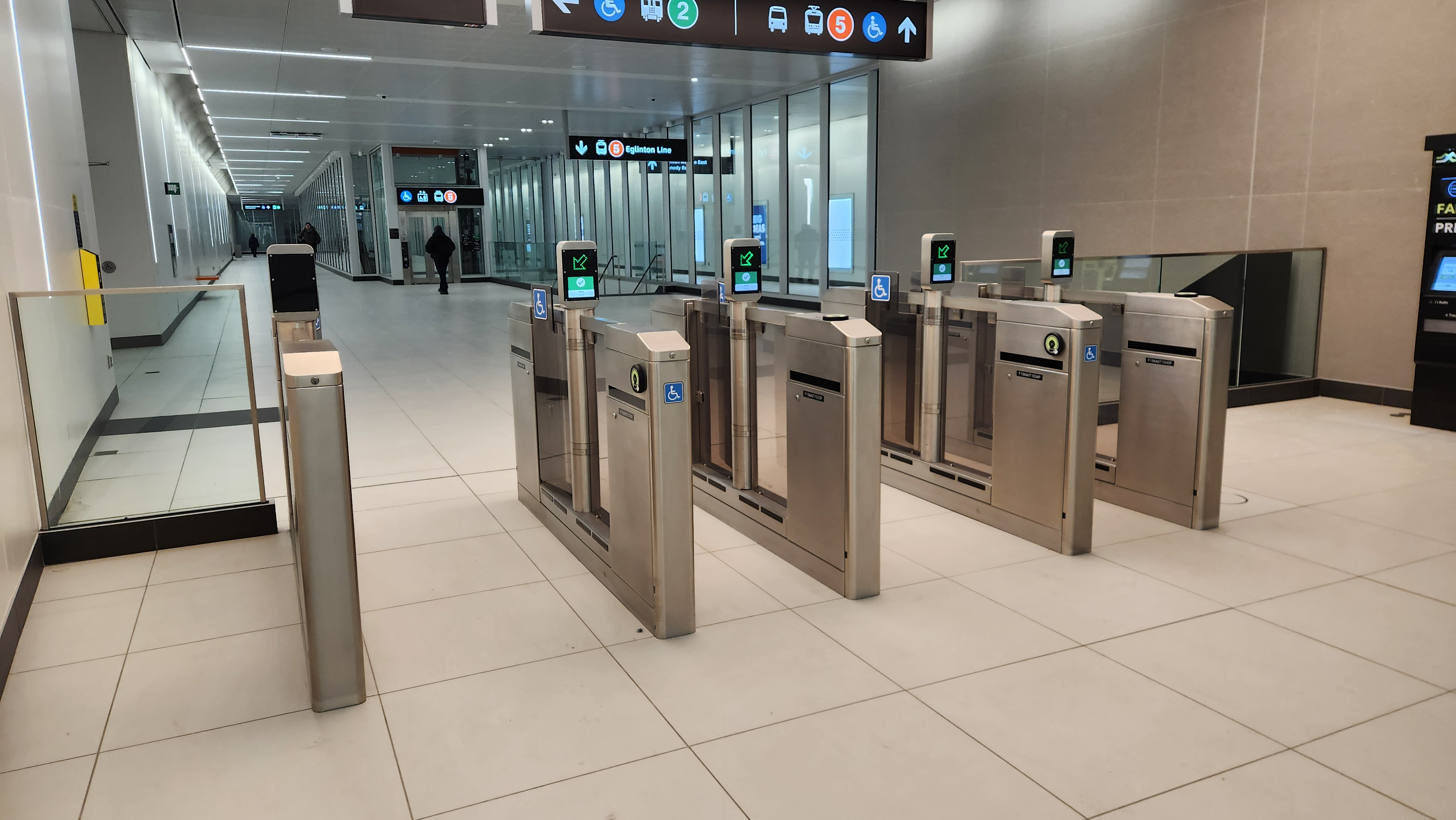
Scheidt & Bachmann fare gates on the Toronto subway

Scheidt & Bachmann's Fare Collections Systems division focuses on public transport. This division produces account-based farecard systems, fareboxes, ticket vending machines, fare gates, and data management products.

Notable products include the Ticket XPress series of ticket vending machines.

=== Railway signalling ===
Scheidt & Bachmann's Signalling Systems division offers a wide range of products and services for railway infrastructure. These include digital interlockings and level crossing technology. Signalling Systems supplies a training system for operating and interlocking simulation, as well as operations management and information systems for local and long-distance transport.

=== Parking management ===
The Parking Solutions dividsion develops hardware and software for parking facilities. Its hardware includes barriers, pay-on-foot machines, monitoring devices and cameras. In the software field, the Parking Solutions business unit offers applications for parking space management and car park administration, as well as smart payment systems.

=== Fuel dispensers ===
Scheidt & Bachmann's Energy Retail Solutions division (formerly called Fuel Retail Solutions) produces products used at fuelling stations and charging stations, including fuel dispensers, payment terminals, software, and advertising systems.

== Subsidiaries ==
Scheidt & Bachmann now has numerous subsidiaries in many countries around the world. This includes, among others: Slovakia, USA, Tunisia, Canada, Belgium, France, Great Britain, Ireland, Netherlands, Austria, Poland, Sweden and Spain.
