= Shere SMART =

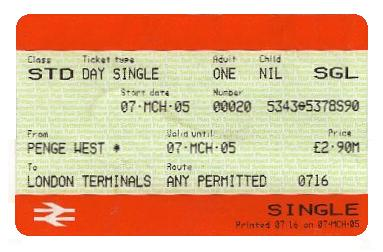

System information
- Full name: Shere SMART Terminal
- Machine type: Ticket Office-based
- Type of ticket stock: Hopper-fed
- Manufacturer: Shere Ltd, Guildford, Surrey

History
- First introduced: January 2003
- Machine number range: 5010-5381
- Window number range: Upwards from 90
- Machines in use: 264

Locations/areas/train operating companies
- Current users: Southern; First Capital Connect
- Former users: Southeastern South West Trains; Northern Rail; Arriva Trains Wales; First Great Western; Merseyrail Chiltern Railways

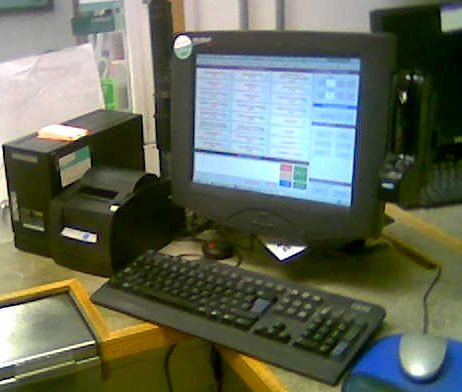
Shere SMART terminal with Newbury Data ND4020 ticket printer (left) and tally roll printer (right of printer)

The Shere SMART ("SMART Terminal") is a desktop-based railway ticket issuing system, developed by the Guildford-based company Shere Ltd, utilising Newbury Data ND4020 ticket printer, first introduced in Britain in 2003. Since the first trial installation of the system in the ticket office at London Bridge station, approximately 300 terminals have been installed at stations on the Southern and former Thameslink networks.

== Origins ==
After the railway network was privatised in the mid-1990s, it was decided that when the existing "Heritage" ticket issuing systems (APTIS, SPORTIS and the Quickfare passenger-operated machines) needed replacing, the contracts should be put out to competitive tender. Although the Rail Settlement Plan (RSP) scheme, overseen and controlled by the newly created Association of Train Operating Companies (ATOC), would set various requirements and regulate the introduction of such systems through an official accreditation process, any company which wished to set up a ticket issuing system and offer it for accreditation could do so. Once it had been accredited, the system could then be offered to the individual Train Operating Companies once they were ready to replace their existing equipment.

Accordingly, having met RSP's requirements, the SMART Terminal began to be installed on a trial basis in 2003. London Bridge was the first station to gain one, in January of that year, when Connex South Eastern elected to put the system on trial. Over the next 18 months, more machines were trialled at various locations by other TOCs as part of the tendering process. (Train Operating Company names shown in the table are those current at the time of installation.)

Train Operating Company	Location	Machine No(s)	Date	Outcome of trial
Connex South Eastern	London Bridge	5010	January 2003	APTIS reinstated, then replaced by Fujitsu STAR
Connex South Central	Gipsy Hill	5011	February 2003	Still in situ
South West Trains	Walton-on-Thames	5012-5014	August 2003	Replaced by Fujitsu STAR
Arriva Trains Northern	Bradford Interchange	5016-5021	December 2003	5016 removed without replacement; others replaced by Cubic FasTIS
Thameslink	London Blackfriars	5023 and 5072	December 2003 (5023) July 2004 (5072)	Replaced by terminals 5201 and 5202
Arriva Trains Wales	Neath	5024-5025	April 2004	Replaced by Fujitsu STAR
First Great Western	Reading	5194-5195	September 2004	Replaced by Fujitsu STAR
Merseyrail	Moorfields	5222	October 2004	Replaced by Fujitsu STAR
Chiltern Railways	Banbury	5374	March 2005	Replaced by Cubic FasTIS

There was also a machine (number 5029) in an Excess Fares office at London Paddington, from August 2004 until June 2006. First Great Western have replaced this with a Fujitsu STAR terminal.

== Installation programme ==
The Southern and Thameslink TOCs, both at that time owned and operated by the Govia company, signed contracts in 2004 to have SMART installed in ticket offices at their stations. Southern began by putting in two terminals each at Balham and Norwood Junction (the latter in conjunction with a major station refurbishment project) during the summer; once these had "bedded in" successfully, the roll-out continued across the rest of the network, with a number of small stations waiting until April 2005 for their APTIS machines to be replaced. Delayed installations occurred at Woodmansterne (September 2005) and Littlehaven (December 2005). The smaller Thameslink network had all of its stations equipped with SMART Terminals between September and December 2004.

== Features ==
- SMART can be operated using a standard keyboard and mouse interface, or by using the terminals' touch-screen capability.
- A programmable list of the 24 most popular tickets from the "home" station is displayed on the screen by default. These can be changed locally or centrally according to temporary requirements - for example, Off-peak Day Returns to Twickenham could be added just before a major rugby game at the stadium there.
- All tickets available for a given journey are listed on the screen in price order, allowing the ticket clerk to discuss ticket options with the passenger more easily.
- Full integration with the database of season ticket holders; this allows renewals to be done much more quickly, removes the need to update the database manually, and ensures that discounts for failure to meet service level targets are automatically applied.
- Integration with the RJIS (Rail Journey Information System), a central database of station names, routes etc.; CRS (Central Reservation System, for booking seats); and LENNON (an accounting system which gives TOCs next-day reporting of sales and settlement of revenue owing).
- Use of "Common Stock" blank ticket stock (code RSP 9599) - see below.

== Common Stock ticketing ==
Whereas the APTIS system used different blank cards for almost every type of ticket, SMART prints almost all tickets on the same, orange-banded stock with no pre-printed headings (batch reference RSP 9599). The main examples are shown here:

Tickets printed on "Common Stock"	Tickets printed on dedicated stock
Travel Tickets	Young Persons Railcards
Platform tickets	Network Railcards
Rail Rovers and Rangers	Senior Railcards
Car Park Tickets	Longer Period Season Tickets (Over One Month)
One Day Travelcards (London)	Annual Season Tickets (Gold Cards)
Seven Day Travelcards (London)	Family Railcards
Seven Day Season Tickets	
One Month Season Tickets	
Excess Tickets	
Seat/Cycle Reservations	
Supplement Tickets	
Advance Purchase Tickets	
