= National Location Code =

A map of England, Wales and Scotland showing the approximate boundaries of each NLC "zone", as described in the accompanying table.

The National Location Code (NLC) is a four-digit number allocated to every railway station and ticket issuing point in Great Britain for use with the ticketing system on the British railway network. They are used in the issue of tickets and for accounting purposes. They are a subset of the NLCs created by British Rail, which are based on four "main" digits plus two supplementary digits.

== Introduction by British Rail ==
NLCs were introduced as a method of accounting for and attributing costs and revenue to railway assets. This quotation is taken from the 14th Edition (January 1987) of the National Location Code listing book, published by the British Railways Board:

"With the widespread use of computers within British Railways and the advent of national computer systems for dealing with payroll compilation, stores recording and accounting, wagon control, traffic data, revenue and expenditure accounting, market and traffic surveys etc., the need for a standard location code became increasingly important. In order to meet this need, the Regions were asked in November 1966 to revise and update the publication then known as the Terminals and Mileage Gazetteer Code. At the same time the opportunity was taken to include all sidings, yards, depots, offices, administrative centres, etc., where there is 'Railway' activity. [...] A file was developed based on a six-digit code known as the British Railways National Location Code. This was [first] published on 1 January 1968."

Each six-digit code is split into two parts: the first four digits identify the location of the asset or cost centre, and the final two give more information about the specific asset. The "base" location (including all stations and ticket-issuing locations) has 00 after the first four digits; other two-digit combinations signify other types of asset, with the first four digits indicating the "base" location to which they relate. In ticket issuing, only the first four digits are used. Some examples:

- 852400 is Hebden Bridge as a location, asset base and cost centre.
- 852405 is the Up Refuge Siding at Hebden Bridge.
- 8524 is shown on tickets issued at Hebden Bridge.
- 548400 is Crawley as a location, asset base and cost centre.
- 548461 is the (now disused) signalbox controlling the points and level crossings there
- 548465 is the former parcels delivery agency.
- 5484 is shown on tickets issued at Crawley.
  - 548500 is allocated to Crawley New Yard, a goods facility north of nearby Three Bridges station. It had additional codes based on the users of the yard, such as the National Coal Board (which maintained a coal concentration depot there until 1981) and Ready Mixed Concrete.

== Consequence for ticketing systems ==
In the 1960s and 1970s, there were various ticket issuing systems in use, some quite localised. Some had simple numerical code structures covering a limited number of stations in the relevant area, but there was no universal coding system to identify stations until the NLC was introduced. NLCs began to appear on certain types of ticket (such as the Southern Region mainstay, the NCR21) almost immediately.

With the introduction of the fully computerised INTIS (Intermediate Ticket Issuing System) in the early 1980s, the four-digit version of the NLC became fully established. INTIS tickets were partly pre-printed, and the station name printed on the ticket had the NLC next to it. The machine printed the codes of the "origin" and "destination" stations on the top line of the ticket.

INTIS was superseded by APTIS in 1986; the latter became the universal ticket office system for the next 15–20 years, with the last APTIS machines removed in March 2007. APTIS tickets had the NLC of the station of issue printed on their second line, irrespective of whether the journey started there - so for example, a ticket issued at Brighton (NLC 5268) for a journey from Gatwick Airport to London Victoria had 5268.

An NLC covered the station and all of its associated accounting activities; it was on everything from tickets issued from self-service ticket machines to ticket office staff wage slips. Where stations on the same site needed to be treated as separate entities, they were allocated different codes. When London Waterloo's East (serving South Eastern Division destinations) began in the late 1980s to be considered as a separate station from the main London Waterloo (NLC 5598), its self-service machines got their own code, 5158. Revenue could then be apportioned correctly to the relevant Division, and, after privatisation, the correct Train Operating Company (TOC).

== The modern era ==
After the railway network was privatised in the mid-1990s, there was a need for additional NLCs to be created:

- South West Trains TOC opened Travel Centres at many of its larger stations, for booking of more complex journeys, and wanted each one to have a different code from that of the station to differentiate revenue derived from Travel Centre bookings, typically more complex and lengthy and often of high monetary value. Other TOCs did this to a lesser extent.
- Many TOCs began to operate Telesales facilities and, later, online booking facilities.
- As new ticket-issuing systems began to be rolled out to replace APTIS and the less widespread "Quickfare" self-service machines, TOCs began to use different codes to distinguish between revenue derived from ticket offices and self-service machines. With "New Generation" systems are in place throughoutthe network, the following distinction is universal:
  - Ticket offices use the original NLC, allocated in the 1960s;
  - Self-service machines use a new NLC that may have been allocated at any time since privatisation and which bears no relation to the original geographical boundaries.

=== Example of the allocation of new codes ===
In 1998, Brighton was supplied with two wall-mounted touch-screen machines by Cubic Transportation Systems, Inc., issuing a limited range of tickets by credit card only; code 8882 was given to these. Subsequently, these (and the erstwhile Quickfare machines) were replaced by a six "FASTticket" touch-screen machines manufactured by Shere Ltd.; these bore NLC 8882 as well, whereas the ticket office machines ("SMART Terminal", supplied by Shere) used the station's original code, 5268.

== Special NLCs ==
Any location to which railway revenue or expenditure can be attributed was coded in the 1960s (or later, if it came into existence subsequently): codes are allocated to any location, be it fixed or mobile, that can issue tickets, and to any location that can have a ticket issued to it for a journey from a National Rail station. Some examples are:

- London Underground stations: codes run upwards from 0500, allocated alphabetically by station name. Anomalies have arisen where stations have opened or changed their name.
- Docklands Light Railway stops, Northern Ireland Railways and Iarnród Éireann stations have codes in the 0000 series.
- Portable machines used by on-train staff, originally PORTIS (Portable Ticket Issuing System), then SPORTIS (Super-PORTIS) and now PDA-based "Avantix Mobile". NLCs were allocated to depots and conductors' bases from which machines were sent out each day.
- Rail-appointed Travel Agencies.
- Back-office machines at stations or in railway offices for accounting purposes.
- Agencies used by local authorities to issue concessionary passes, season tickets and similar.
- Extra issuing points at stations: for example, excess fares windows, positions used only for season ticket renewals or business/executive travel tickets.
- Machines in airport terminals.
- Standalone travel centres away from stations, such as One Stop Travel in Brighton city centre (3644, now 2791) and the former Victoria Street Travel Centre in London (6127).
- Station groups. These pseudo-locations have codes in the 0200 and 0400 ranges.

== Original allocation of NLCs ==
When British Railways was created in 1948, it was split into six operating regions; these became five in the 1960s (Eastern, London Midland, Western, Southern and Scottish). The distribution of NLCs broadly followed this pattern.

Series (and colour on map)	Geographical Area	Selected Examples	BR Regions
1000-1999	West Coast Main Line (southern section); West Midlands (north of Birmingham); Midland Main Line (southern section); London Marylebone-Aylesbury section of Chiltern line; Cumbrian Coast Line	1127 Birmingham New Street; 1243 Crewe; 1444 London Euston; 1823 Derby	MR
2000-2999	West Coast Main Line (northern section); Merseyside; Greater Manchester; North Wales Coast Line	2118 Carlisle; 2246 Liverpool Lime Street; 2437 Holyhead; 2968 Manchester Piccadilly	MR
3000-3999	Great Western Main Line and associated branches; Chiltern main line; South Wales and Welsh/English border area	3087 London Paddington; 3526 Penzance; 3607 Hereford; 3899 Cardiff Central	WR
4000-4999	Lines in West of England and Wales north of those in "3000" series; ex-Great Western Railway lines in West Midlands	4222 Swansea; 4303 Aberystwyth; 4387 Shrewsbury; 4558 Stratford-upon-Avon	WR
5000-5999	All lines south, south-east and south-west of London	See below	SR
6000-6999	East Coast Main Line (southern section); Great Eastern Main Line; lines in eastern England; suburban lines north and east of London; Midland Main Line (northern section)	6121 London Kings Cross; 6417 Doncaster; 6691 Sheffield; 6861 Colchester	ER
7000-7999	East Anglia; East Coast Main Line (northern section); associated branch lines in North-east England	7022 Cambridge; 7309 Norwich; 7728 Newcastle; 7929 Middlesbrough	ER
8000-8999	North and North-east England east of the Pennines, including most of Yorkshire; Highlands and north of Scotland	8126 Hull; 8263 York; 8487 Leeds; 8976 Aberdeen	ER, ScR
9000-9999	Central and Southern Scotland, including suburban Glasgow and Edinburgh	9039 Dundee; 9328 Edinburgh Waverley; 9555 Stranraer Harbour; 9813 Glasgow Central	ScR

=== NLCs in the Southern Region ===
The Southern Region was divided into three divisions: South Eastern, Central and South Western based on the three pre-Grouping companies. NLCs were allocated (approximately) following these boundaries, as follows:

Series	Geographical Area	Selected Examples	Division
5000-5099	Kent, mostly served from London Victoria	5004 Ashford International; 5007 Canterbury West; 5033 Dover Priory; 5064 Bromley South	South Eastern
5100-5199	Kent, mostly served from London Charing Cross/London Bridge	5122 Orpington; 5146 Greenwich; 5148 London Bridge; 5199 Chatham	South Eastern
5200-5299	Secondary routes in Kent and East Sussex (including Tonbridge-Hastings); East Coastway and West Coastway routes in Sussex	5219 Hastings; 5230 Tunbridge Wells; 5268 Brighton; 5279 Worthing	South Eastern, Central
5300-5399	South London, Surrey and Sussex	5309 Horsham; 5334 Uckfield; 5355 East Croydon; 5360 Epsom	Central
5400-5499	South London, Surrey and Sussex - overlaps with 5300 series	5416 Gatwick Airport; 5448 Eastbourne; 5484 Crawley; 5486 East Grinstead	Central
5500-5599	Surrey and Hampshire, including Isle of Wight	5520 Basingstoke; 5537 Portsmouth & Southsea; 5578 Wimbledon; 5598 London Waterloo	South Western
5600-5699	Surrey and Hampshire	5623 Aldershot; 5631 Guildford; 5672 Windsor & Eton Riverside; 5685 Woking	South Western
5700-5799	South-west England, including some former Southern Region lines in Western Region territory	5712 Westbury; 5714 Axminster; 5725 Barnstaple; 5756 Exmouth	South Western
5800-5899	London end of routes from London Waterloo to southwest England	5838 Yeovil Junction; 5876 Bournemouth; 5883 Poole; 5899 Eastleigh	South Western
5900-5999	London end of routes from London Waterloo to southwest England; associated secondary routes and branch lines	5924 Winchester; 5932 Southampton Central; 5961 Dorchester South; 5965 Weymouth	South Western

== Anomalies ==
Since privatisation, the need for new codes has grown so much that they have largely stopped being allocated on a geographical basis, especially where additional codes are being given to a station. Where a new station is given a geographically correct code, it is usually because the station had been planned for some time and a gap was left in the appropriate section of codes. An example is Lea Green (NLC 2339), which was proposed for many years (under the name "Marshalls Cross") before being opened in 2000. Sometimes, as at Chandler's Ford, a station is reopened with its original code after being closed. When Coleshill Parkway between Birmingham and Nuneaton was opened in 2007 it was allocated 9882, which relates geographically to Scotland.

Some quirks have always existed, however:

- Kensington Olympia station was given code 3092 as it was considered part of the Western Region although it was not served by any scheduled trains from that region, with only a tenuous physical connection (the little-used North Pole Junction). It passed into Southern Region control, when the only services were peak-hour shuttle trains from Clapham Junction, before passing to the Midland Region before privatisation when a Clapham Junction-Willesden Junction service began (now operated by London Overground and Southern).
- Skipton formed the boundary between the LMR and ER, and so could have been given a 2000-series or an 8000-series code. Although most of its services originated from the ER, it was given 2728.
- The North London Line (Richmond-Stratford; Richmond-North Woolwich until December 2006) crosses several regions. The first two stations, Kew Gardens and Gunnersbury, were given 5500-series codes to match Richmond. The London Underground District Line route was left for LMR territory, with 1000-series codes. Because the LMR had a terminus at Broad Street in the City of London (closed 1986), the 1000-series continued until the junction where the branch line to Broad Street left the North London Line; the junction formed the boundary between the LMR and the ER, with 6000-series codes continuing for the rest of the route. When a new station opened at Dalston Kingsland, it was given 1429, as it lay on the LMR side of the junction.
- The Spa Valley Railway recently completed its extension to the National Rail network at Eridge, with through ticketing. Stations were given the alpha-numeric NLCs K569, Tunbridge Wells (SpVR); K570, Groombridge (SpVR); and K571, High Rocks Halt (SpVR). Eridge retains its BR era code of 5459.
