= Liverpool station group =

Ticketing group of four stations in Liverpool

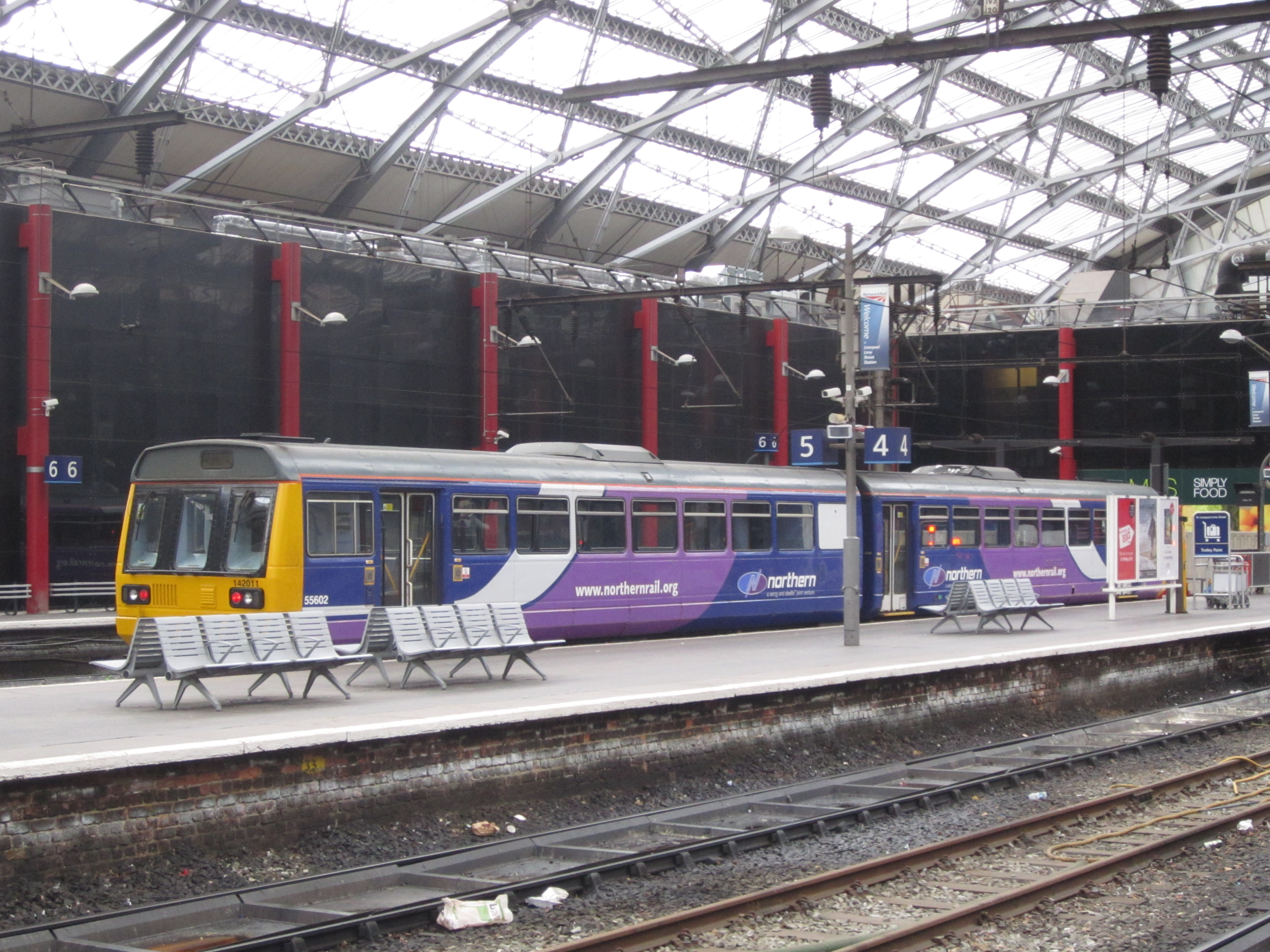
Northern 142011 at Lime Street High Level platform 5

The Liverpool station group is a station group of four railway stations in Liverpool City Centre, England consisting of James Street, Lime Street Low Level, Central and Moorfields. The station group is printed on national rail tickets as Liverpool Stns and does not include the station of Liverpool South Parkway, which is located south of the city centre in Garston near Liverpool John Lennon Airport.

== Stations ==
Liverpool Lime Street is Liverpool's principal railway station and is located, as the name denotes, on Lime Street opposite St Georges Hall. As Liverpool's main station, it is served by all of Liverpool's longer distance services and many local services; including Merseyrail's City and Wirral (via the lower level platform) lines. The station is managed by Network Rail and services are provided by Avanti West Coast, London Northwestern Railway, East Midlands Railway, Northern, Merseyrail, Transport for Wales Rail and TransPennine Express

Liverpool Central station is located on Ranelagh Street inside the Central Shopping Centre and provides links between the Wirral and Northern lines of the Merseyrail Network.

Liverpool James Street is, as its name denotes, on James Street near the corner of The Strand; it is served by the Wirral Line only. James Street is also the closest station to the Waterfront area and Mathew Street (of the Cavern Club fame).

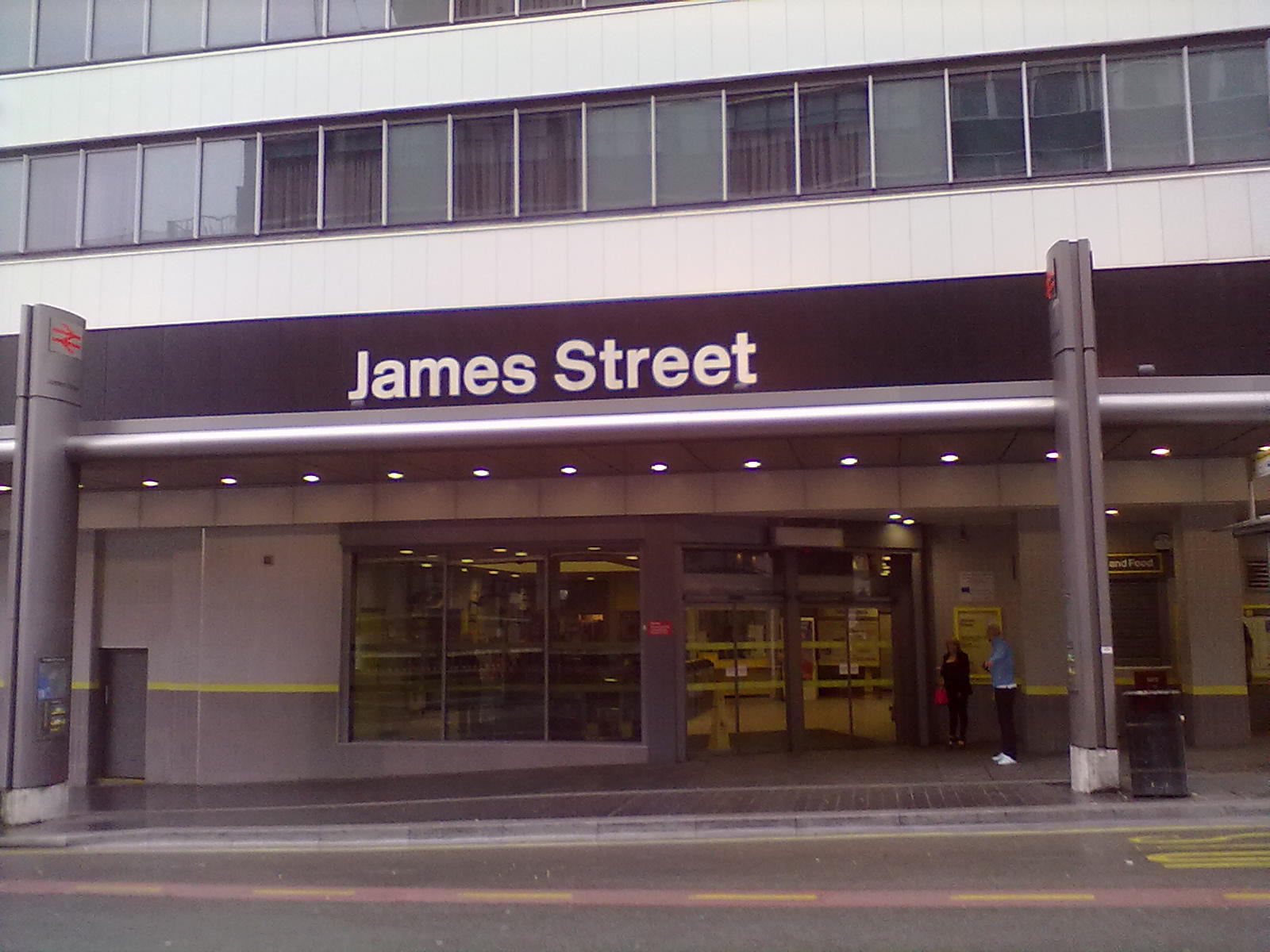
James Street station's main entrance

Moorfields station is located on Moorfields just off Dale Street in the north of the City Centre and provides links between the Wirral and Northern lines of the Merseyrail Network.

== Connections ==
Merseyrail Network

Tickets marked as LIVERPOOL STNS may be used to exit the railway network at any of the four city stations. All stations are connected by the Wirral Line of the Merseyrail Network. The city centre loop of the Wirral Line operates in a clockwise direction (James St, Moorfields, Lime Street, Central and back to James Street), passengers changing between the Wirral and Northern Lines may use either Moorfields or Central depending upon direction of travel.
