= Cubic FasTIS =

Former ticket issuing system by Cubic

System information
- Full name: Cubic FasTIS
- Machine type: Ticket Office-based
- Type of ticket stock: Hopper-fed
- Manufacturer: Cubic Transportation Systems

History
- First introduced: April 2005
- Machine number range: 0001-0395
- Window number range: Upwards from 51
- Machines in use: 305 (as of May 2007)

Locations/areas/train operating companies
- Current users: Transport for London
- Former users: South West Trains Govia Thameslink Railway; Heathrow Express Northern Rail

Cubic FasTIS (Flexible and Secure Ticket Issuing System) was a TIS (ticket issuing system) developed by Cubic for Transport for London and rolled out across a large number of National Rail stations in the London area. It could also be used by revenue protection officers to check the validity of possibly inauthentic tickets.

is the latest TIS introduced to the UK National Rail Retailers. The prototype was piloted at Chiltern Railways High Wycombe station from April 2005, the second pilot machine was deployed at Banbury station. Following successful piloting, both Northern Rail and Chiltern Railways selected FasTIS to replace their APTIS fleet.

Notably, the prototype at High Wycombe was destroyed when the station burnt down on Sunday 27 November 2005. FasTIS was rolled out across all Northern locations from around December 2005; Chiltern rolled out across their stations around mid-2006. Developed by Cubic Transportation Systems, FasTIS is unique in embedding a journey planner. FasTIS was derived from the LUL Ticket Office Machine developed for the TfL Prestige Project.

CTSL was also the maintainer of heritage TISs – APTIS and SPORTIS – after taking over Thorn Transit Systems in April 1997. A derivation of FasTIS called FasTIS+ was commissioned by RSP in late 2006 to replace the APTIS-ANT combination in London, used to retail TfL Oyster card products. FasTIS+ fully integrates the TfL Oyster and National Rail sales, and 99 machines are currently deployed across in-zone London rail stations.

Cubic FasTIS is now being replaced by Cubic FTO machine - 64bit and PCI-DSS secure.

In June 2006, Northern Rail awarded a £2.3 million contract to Cubic for them to install FasTIS on their network, which is equivalent to £4,000,000 in 2025. This included 236 units installed at 153 stations. Cubic was contracted for the supply, installation, and maintenance of these machines. As of that date, Cubic was responsible for over 400 systems installed across five continents, including in London, New York City, Brisbane, and Singapore.

By March 2021, the system had begun to be withdrawn in due to train operating companies switching to alternative systems. This meant that stations in the London area would no longer be able to sell Oyster cards to customers. Surplus stocks of Oyster cards were transferred to London Underground stations where they could still be issued.
