= Avantix B8070 =

Avantix B8070 "MultiTicket"
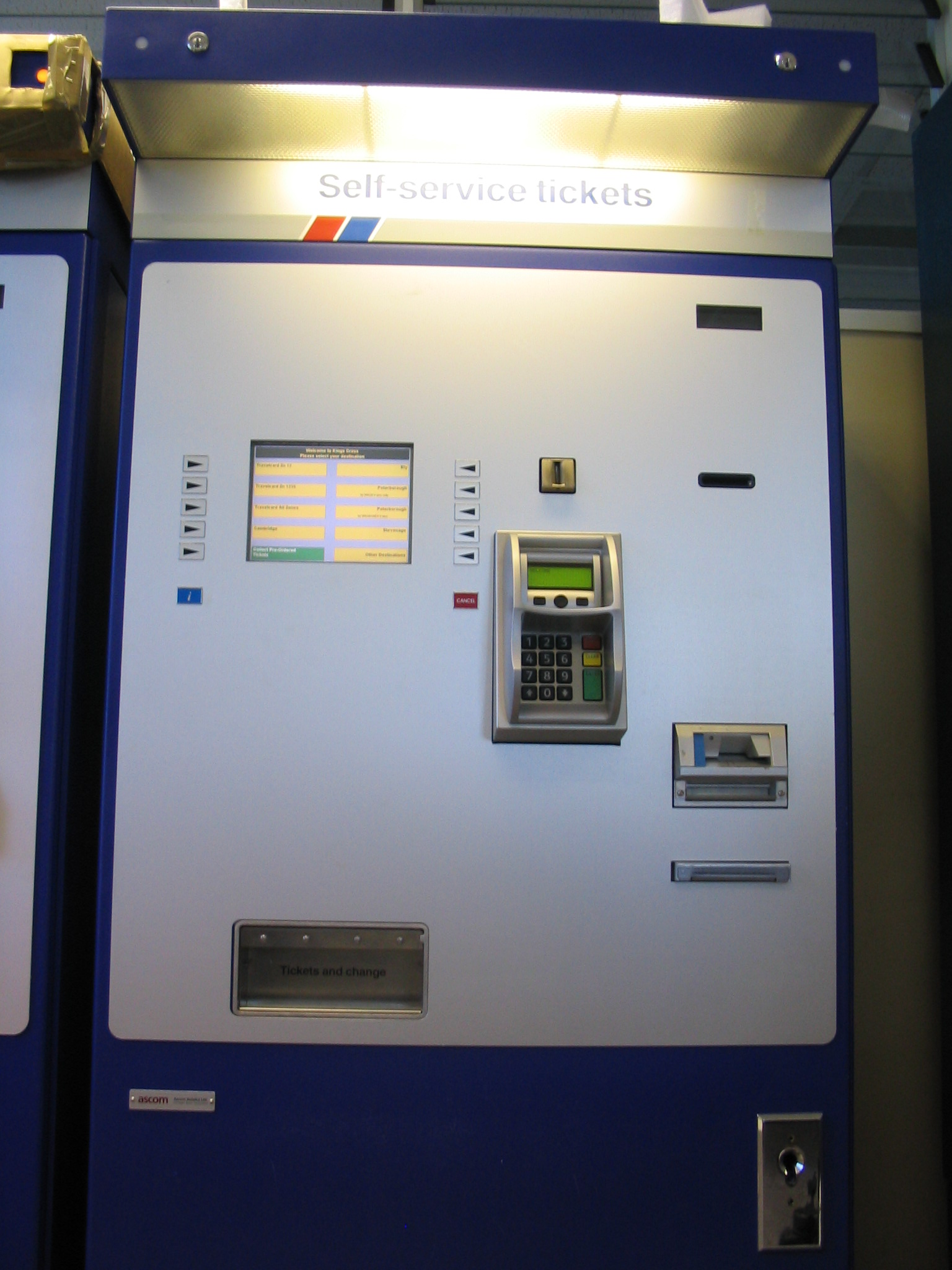
- Avantix B8070 "MultiTicket" self-service ticket machine, in the Network SouthEast livery, January 2009

System information
- Full name: Ascom B8050
- Machine type: Self-service machine
- Type of ticket stock: Continuous roll
- Manufacturer: Ascom Autelca AG, Bern, Switzerland

History
- First introduced: 1999
- Window number range: Upwards from 01
- Machines in use: Approximately 230

Locations/areas/train operating companies

Avantix B8070, more commonly known as Avantix MultiTicket was a passenger-operated railway ticket issuing system, installed at British railway stations from 1999 onwards. The machines were available as upgrades to the Ascom B8050 Quickfare or as new builds.

The machine was developed by Sema Group, later SchlumbergerSema and then Atos Origin.

Most machines were withdrawn during 2007 and 2008. The last Avantix B8070 was withdrawn in January 2009. The last B870 was withdrawn in North America by NJ TRANSIT in 2011.

== Introduction of the Avantix B8070 ==
A pilot Avantix B8070 was trialled at the East Croydon railway station in 1998. The first machines in live use went into service on Thameslink stations, starting with St Albans. Other significant deployments followed on South West Trains, at West Anglia Great Northern stations between Kings Lynn and Peterborough to London King's Cross and on c2c. Small numbers of machines were deployed at other stations, including Leeds, Manchester Piccadilly and London Paddington.

== Details of the machine ==
The user interface comprised an ATM-style display screen with hardware buttons for selecting menu items displayed on each side of the screen.

B8070 machines were fitted with an industrial PC connected to the UK rail wide area network. This offered a significant advantage over the B8050 in support terms, giving the ability to connect to each machine from a central location and:

- update fares
- change the tickets on offer
- diagnose faults

A significant advantage of the Avantix B8070 over the Ascom B8050 was the ability to handle credit card payments. Initially, this was by reading the magnetic stripe of the credit card, but this was updated to handle Chip and PIN cards with the addition of a Hypercom Chip and PIN card reader and pin pad.

The software application could handle tickets to all GB destinations. However, to reduce scrolling through lists of stations, these were in practice limited to the 200 most popular destinations from the station, plus all of the London Underground destinations.

=== Ticket stock ===
Avantix B8070 offered the standard centre stripe mag encoded orange CCST stock for singles and returns, and also the green season ticket stock. Receipts were printed on a white tally roll.

=== Branding ===
Several train operating companies took the opportunity to customise the front of the machine with branded graphics.
