= Rail Settlement Plan =

U.K. Rail division

Rail Settlement Plan (RSP) is a division of the Rail Delivery Group in the United Kingdom. It provides a wide range of common services to the UK's train operating companies and third-party providers of information and retail services. It was founded in 1995.

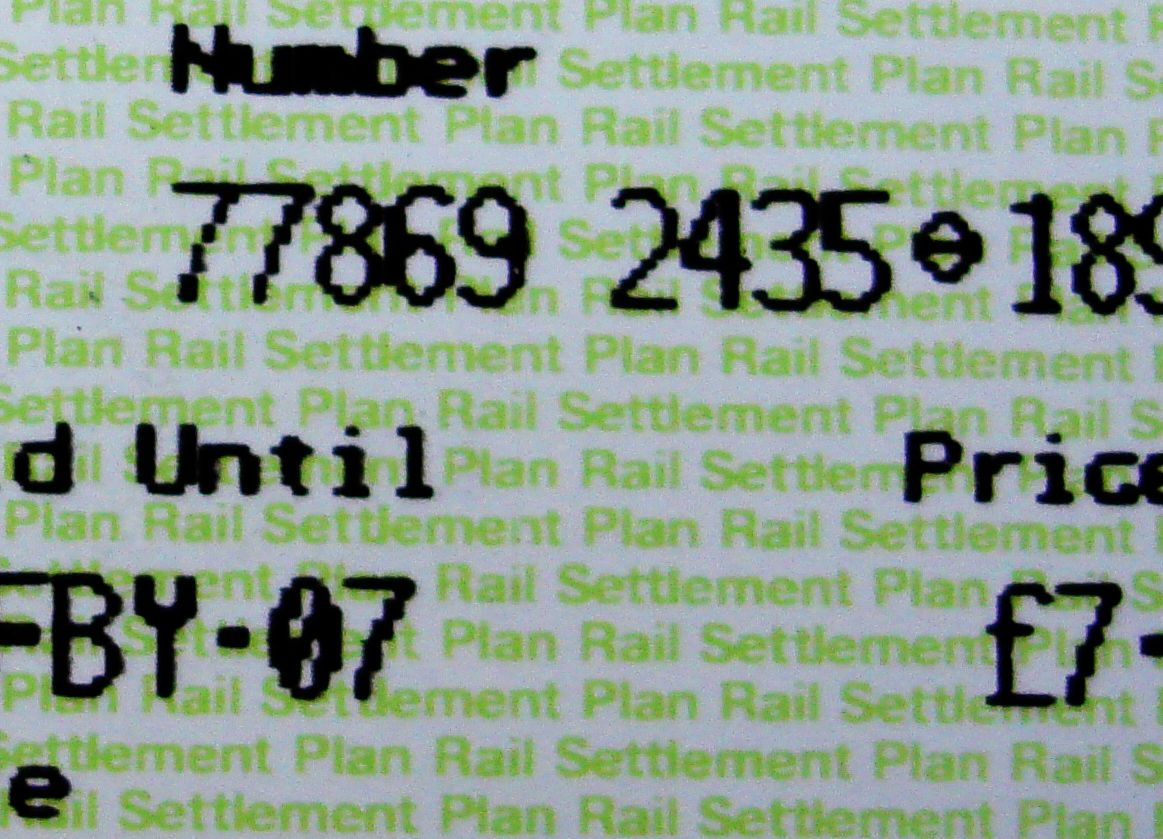
UK rail ticket background

The green background of all UK rail tickets was made up of the repeated words "Rail Settlement Plan." In 2013, the railway started migrating to new ticket stock which uses the words "National Rail" instead.

== History ==
The company was established on the privatisation of British Rail primarily for the purpose of distributing the revenue received from the purchase of generic, non-company-specific train tickets. This revenue is split between the retailer and the train operating companies (TOCs) that run trains along the route. For example, the same railway ticket is valid from Bristol Temple Meads to Taunton on all services: the RSP provides a process to share the revenue between the two train operating companies that run trains along this route (Great Western Railway and CrossCountry).

== Expansion ==
Since privatisation, the company has increased the range of services it provides to train operators. The company now:

- Collects retail sales data from 8,500 ticket issuing systems
- Carries out the correct allocation of ticket revenue to train operators
- Settles that revenue to the operators
- Sets standards and accredits all industry ticket issuing systems
- Maintains the central industry fares database and provides tools for train operators to set fares
- Distributes fares, timetable, station and other industry data to ticket issuing and information systems
- Provides the National Reservations Service enabling retailers to book reservations on all trains with reservable seats
- Provides the capability to pick up preordered tickets at station ticket machines (Ticket-on-Departure)
- Provides the industry standard ticket stock

=== Revenue splitting ===
The RSP system LENNON apportions revenue to each TOC. It replaced the British Rail system Capri in April 2002 and is operated by Worldline. Lennon collects all ticket sales data and processes it overnight, sending management information to the industry data warehouse. Lennon also creates the accounts for each TOC, and has interfaces to settlement systems that manage the four weekly net settlement of rail industry revenue. Lennon applies both agreed (between TOCs) allocation factors and those created by the ORCATS (Operational Research Computerised Allocation of Tickets to Services) model. Lennon also calculates rail industry commission to ticket sellers, which varies from 2% to 9% of the sale price, depending on the product, and if the sale is made face-to-face or remotely over the Internet.

Commission is funded by each train operating company (TOC) in proportion to sales received. For example, if a TOC receives 59% of the sale as earnings, they pay 59% of the commission. Lennon also calculates adjustments for refunds and fees for the fulfilment of tickets sold over the internet, but printed at station kiosks.

== See also ==
- Railway Clearing House
