= New York City transit fares =

OMNY vending machine (left) and MetroCard vending machine (right)

The fares for services operated under the brands of MTA Regional Bus (New York City Bus, MTA Bus), New York City Subway (NYC Subway), Staten Island Railway (SIR), PATH, Roosevelt Island Tramway, AirTrain JFK, NYC Ferry, and the suburban bus operators Nassau Inter-County Express (NICE) and Westchester County Bee-Line System (Bee-Line) are listed below. As of 2026, most bus routes, the subway, the Staten Island Railway, and the Roosevelt Island Tramway charge a $3.00 fare; a higher fare is charged for ferries, express buses, and the AirTrain JFK.

== Current fares ==
=== Fare media ===
MetroCard is accepted on MTA Regional buses, the New York City Subway, Metro North's Hudson Rail Link, the Staten Island Railway, Roosevelt Island Tramway, AirTrain JFK, and Nassau Inter-County Express. Local MTA bus routes and NICE and Bee-Line buses also accept coins (though pennies and half-dollars are not accepted on Select Bus Service routes), while MTA buses, Hudson Rail Link, the Roosevelt Island Tram, Airtrain JFK, the subway, Nassau Inter-County Express, Bee-Line Bus, and the Staten Island Railway also accept OMNY. Westchester Bee-Line Bus accepts also accepts dollar bills of $1, $2, $5, and $10 as payment, but does not allow MetroCard as payment. As of January 2026, customers cannot buy or refill a MetroCard.

PATH only accepts TAPP (a clone of OMNY); however, TAPP cannot be used on any other transit system in New York City. PATH accepted MetroCards and SmartLink (a fare card) until September 1, 2026. The subway, Roosevelt Island Tram, the Staten Island Railway, and express buses only accept MetroCard and OMNY as payment.

As of December 31, 2020, all subway stations, the Staten Island Railway, (Note: St. George and Tompkinsville are the only stations on the Staten Island Railway where fares are collected to enter and exit.) and all MTA-operated buses are equipped with OMNY readers. As of January 2026, the only unlimited option available on OMNY is the 7-day fare cap, and 30-day options were discontinued except on Airtrain JFK.

	MetroCard	Coins	OMNY	TAPP
MTA local buses (Note: Including Limited-Stop and Select Bus Service buses.)	check	(Note: No half-dollar coins or pennies accepted on Select Bus Service buses.)	check	X mark
MTA express buses	check	X mark	check	X mark
NYC Subway	check	(Note: Cash is accepted for purchasing fare media at stations.)	check	X mark
Staten Island Railway	check	X mark	check	X mark
PATH	X mark	X mark	X mark	check
Roosevelt Island Tramway	check	X mark	check	X mark
AirTrain JFK	check	X mark	check	X mark
Nassau Inter-County Express	check	check	check	X mark
Westchester County Bee-Line	X mark	(Note: No pennies accepted.)	check	X mark

NYC Ferry and NJ Transit fares are paid using physical or digital tickets (in addition to cash on NJ Transit), which are not compatible with the MetroCard, OMNY, or any of the city's other modes of transport.

=== Base fares ===
All fares are in US dollars. Children under 44" tall ride for free with fare-paying rider; limit is 3 except for NYC Ferry and Express Buses.

Service	Fare type	Fare	Special fares
MTA Bus / NYC Bus (Local, Rush, Limited-Stop, Select Bus Service), (Note: The Q70 SBS is free.); NICE Bus, (Note: All Bee-Line and NICE services (including services signed as express) are local services for purposes of the fare except for the BxM4C.) NYC Subway, SIR, (Note: Staten Island Railway fares are collected only at St. George and Tompkinsville stations (in both directions). A second fare is not deducted for travel between St. George and Tompkinsville (except for SingleRide Tickets).) Roosevelt Island Tramway, Hudson Rail Link	Full	$3.00	$3.50 for a SingleRide Ticket
MTA Bus / NYC Bus (Local, Rush, Limited-Stop, Select Bus Service), NICE Bus, NYC Subway, SIR, Roosevelt Island Tramway, Hudson Rail Link	Reduced	$1.50	
Bee-Line Bus (except BxM4C),	Full	$3.00	
Bee-Line Bus (except BxM4C),	Reduced	$1.50	
PATH	Full	$3.25	$3.25 for a PATH SingleRide Ticket
PATH	Reduced	$1.50	$1.50 for PATH by using Senior TAPP
Express buses (MTA / NYC)	Full	$7.25	Children under 2 ride free when sitting on the parent's lap
Express buses (MTA / NYC)	Reduced (off-peak) (Note: Peak travel periods for express buses are 06:00–10:00 a.m. and 3:00–7:00 p.m. weekdays except holidays.)	$3.85	
BxM4C bus	Full	$7.75	
BxM4C bus	Reduced (off-peak)	$3.85	
Student OMNY card (Note: Student OMNY cards are distributed by New York City schools, are valid for one calendar year.: OMNY cards are good for 4 trips a day on MTA local buses, subways, Staten Island Railway, Roosevelt Island Tram, and Hudson Rail Link.; OMNY cards can be used at any time of day throughout the year.)		Free	
NICE Student Fare (Note: The NICE Student Fare requires a NICE student pass, which is issued to students, on request, by their school system. Valid weekdays 6:00 a.m. to 7:00 p.m. during the school year, for travel to and from school only.)		$2.25	
NYC Ferry		$4.50	$1.45 for anyone eligible in the Ferry & Student Discount Programs
AirTrain JFK		$8.75	
Access-A-Ride (NYC paratransit)		$3.00	
Able-Ride (Nassau County paratransit)		$4	$60 for a book of 20 tickets plus one free ticket

=== Unlimited-ride fares ===
The only unlimited option as of January 2026 is the fare cap system. On local transit (subways, buses, the Roosevelt Island Tramway, and the Staten Island Railway), the fare cap is $35 a week ($17.50 for reduced-fare customers). After paying that amount within seven days of an initial tap, customers receive unlimited rides for the rest of that seven-day period. Express buses have a separate fare cap of $67 a week. Local transit fares do not count toward the express bus cap, and vice versa. Airtrain JFK started its farecap system and OMNY discounts (30-Day Fare Cap — $43.50 max and Group Fare — up to 5 riders for $26.75 max) on June 11, 2026.

Between February 28, 2022, and August 20, 2023, Monday-to-Sunday fare capping applied on OMNY. Users of OMNY paid the base fare on buses, subways, and the Staten Island Railway until they had paid a total amount equal to the cost of the 7-Day Unlimited MetroCard option for fares within a single week (from Monday to Sunday), upon which they did not pay fares for subsequent trips. As of March 2022, this meant that full-fare passengers paid $2.75 for each of the first 12 trips made in a week; after they had paid for 12 trips, their fare payment medium became an unlimited-fare on the 13th tap. Reduced-fare customers were also eligible for the unlimited cap by making 12 trips in a week at $1.35 per ride, for a total cost of $16.20. When the base fare was raised to $2.90 on August 21, 2023, the 7-day cap was modified to apply to any consecutive seven-day period. In addition, the fare cap was raised to $34, so riders paid $2.90 for their first 11 trips and $2.10 for their 12th trip.

=== Transfers ===
==== MetroCard and OMNY ====
All transfers with MetroCard or OMNY are free from bus to subway, local bus to local bus, and subway to local bus (only one transfer per fare paid unless otherwise stated below). For transfers from local bus or subway to express buses (except the BxM4C), a step-up charge of $4 is charged. Customers transferring to suburban buses from another system with a lower base fare must pay the difference between the fare on the first bus and the fare on the second bus. With coins, transfers are available to different local buses only, with some restrictions, and issued upon request when boarding only. All transfers are good for two hours and 18 minutes. The transfer system also includes Bee-Line and NICE services as buses, and the Roosevelt Island Tramway as subway (a Tramway-to-local-bus or Tramway-to-subway transfer is allowed). For trips originating on NICE buses, two free transfers were allowed using MetroCard, but only one free transfer is allowed using OMNY.

SingleRide tickets are valid for one ride within two hours after purchase on local buses and the subway. One bus-to-bus transfer is allowed; however, transfer between buses and subways in either direction are not allowed.

On the Select Bus Service routes except S79, customers paying with coins requiring a transfer must board via the front door and request a transfer from the operator. All other customers may board via any of the three doors on Select Bus Service buses.

Bee-Line customers needing to transfer to Connecticut Transit (I-Bus and route 11), Transport of Rockland (Tappan ZEExpress), Putnam Transit (PART 2), or Housatonic Area Regional Transit (Ridgefield-Katonah Shuttle) services must ask for a transfer, even if paying with MetroCard or OMNY. The BxM4C does not accept or issue any transfers.

NICE customers needing to transfer to City of Long Beach N69, Suffolk County Transit, or Huntington Area Rapid Transit services must ask for a transfer, even if paying with MetroCard or OMNY.

There are no free transfers to or from PATH.

==== Designated multiple-transfer corridors ====
Two transfers are available at several places. The transfers must be made within two hours in order or in reverse order, unless otherwise specified.

===== Multimodal =====
1. Between Staten Island bus routes crossing the Staten Island Railway; the Staten Island Railway through St. George Ferry Terminal; and then either the M15, M20, M55 buses or any subway stations below Fulton Street in Lower Manhattan.
2. Between the Bx11 or Bx35, the Bx19, and the subway at Simpson Street.
3. Between the Bx32, the Bx36, and the subway at Burnside Avenue.
4. Between the Bx30, either the Bx28 or Bx38, and the subway at Norwood–205th Street or certain bus routes connecting with the Bx28/Bx38.
5. Between the M104, the M42, and the subway at 42nd Street–Bryant Park/Fifth Avenue or Grand Central–42nd Street.
6. Between any bus route connecting with the M60/M101/M125; any of the M60, M101, or M125; and the subway at 125th Street and either Lexington Avenue, Lenox Avenue, or Frederick Douglass Boulevard.
7. Between the S59 or S78, the S79 SBS, and any connecting bus or subway route in Brooklyn.

When a Uniticket is purchased on the Long Island Rail Road or the Metro-North Railroad, passengers traveling to a valid Uniticket station may transfer to a local bus at that station without paying an additional fare. The reverse is true for Uniticket holders boarding a bus toward a valid Uniticket station.

===== Bus =====
1. Between the B11 and B6, and any connecting bus route on either line.
2. Between the B61 and B62, and certain connecting bus routes on either line.
3. Between the westbound Bx4A, the westbound Bx4, and certain bus routes connecting with the Bx4.
4. Between the Bx11, certain bus routes connecting with the Bx11/Bx40/Bx42, and the Bx40 and Bx42.
5. Between the Bx18A/B, the eastbound Bx11, and certain bus routes connecting with the Bx11.
6. Between the Bx18A/B, the eastbound Bx35, and certain bus routes connecting with the Bx35.
7. Between the Bx23, the Q50, and certain connecting bus routes on either line.
8. Between the Bx29; any of the Bx5, Bx12, Bx23 or Q50; and certain bus routes connecting with these routes.
9. Between the Bx29, the Bx12, and certain bus routes connecting with the Bx12.
10. Between the Bx35, certain bus routes connecting with the Bx35/Bx11, and the Bx11.
11. Between the Bx36, certain bus routes connecting with the Bx36/Bx40/Bx42, and the Bx40 and Bx42.
12. Between the M20 and M10, and certain connecting bus routes on either line.
13. Between the M55 and M5, and certain connecting bus routes on either line.
14. Between the M100, either the M101 or M125, and certain bus routes connecting with the M101 or M125.
15. Between the M104 and M42, and certain connecting bus routes on either line.
16. Between the M125, the Bx15, and certain connecting bus routes on either line.
17. In Queens, multi-transfer corridors using OMNY and MetroCard are limited to the following:
  1. Between the n20G, the n20H, n20X or n21, and then any connecting bus route.
  2. Between the Q4, Q5, Q42, Q84, Q85, Q86, Q87 and Q89 at Jamaica Center; the Q17, Q30, Q31 and Q75 in downtown Jamaica; and the Q2, Q36, Q43 and Q82 at 168th Street Bus Terminal. Additionally, the second transfer in both directions can be to a Q83 bus.
  3. Between the southbound Q27, the westbound Q83, and the subway (or vice versa). A second transfer is also available between certain connecting bus routes on the Q27, the southbound Q27, and the westbound Q83 (or vice versa).

A six-month pilot program starting in June 2025 for OMNY only (which ended in November): On any trip that began on a Queens bus route, a second free transfer was provided to riders who used the same card or device on all three legs. The third transfer had to take place within three hours of the first tap. Additional transfer corridors are listed in the NYCT Tariff.

===== Subway =====
Pay-Per-Ride MetroCard and OMNY customers cannot make subway-to-subway transfers by exiting the turnstile and entering again, with two exceptions:

- Upper East Side, Manhattan – Lexington Avenue/59th Street on the IRT Lexington Avenue and BMT Broadway Lines (4, 5, 6, <6>, N, R, and W trains) and Lexington Avenue/63rd Street on the 63rd Street lines (M and Q trains).
- Brownsville, Brooklyn – Livonia Avenue (L train) and Junius Street (34 train).

Until 2011, an extra out-of-system subway-to-subway transfer was allowed in Long Island City, Queens, between 23rd Street–Ely Avenue/Long Island City–Court Square on the IND Queens Boulevard and Crosstown Lines and 45th Road–Court House Square on the IRT Flushing Line. This transfer was eliminated with the opening of an in-system transfer passageway among the three stations. Additional out-of-system transfers are added on a case-by-case basis, usually whenever a regular transfer is unavailable due to construction. Past instances included two transfers in Williamsburg and Bedford–Stuyvesant, Brooklyn, due to the 14th Street Tunnel shutdown from 2019 to 2020; a transfer in Gravesend, Brooklyn, due to the BMT Sea Beach Line (N train)'s partial suspension from 2019 to 2020; and two transfers in Inwood, Manhattan, in 2019 due to the closure of the 168th Street station (1 train).

==== Transfer restrictions ====
There are restrictions on transfers, as noted below. The transfer rules and restrictions are identical for MetroCard and OMNY, where OMNY is available.

===== Bus =====
For Pay-Per-Ride MetroCard and OMNY customers, there is no free transfer back onto the same route on which the fare was initially paid, or between the following buses:

- No transfer in the opposite direction (but transfers are permitted to buses in the same direction):
  - M1, M2, M3, M4
  - M101, M102, M103
  - Bx1 and Bx2
- No transfer in either direction:
  - M96 and M106
  - Bx40 and Bx42
- No transfers between NICE bus routes that are not listed on the timetable of the route on which fare is paid. Essentially, one cannot transfer between bus routes that do not intersect.
- Express:
  - No transfers to/from BxM4C, even with a Pay-Per-Ride MetroCard.
  - No transfers between different Union Turnpike express buses (QM1, QM5, QM6, QM31, QM35, QM36) traveling in the opposite direction.

===== Between subway and bus =====
There are no subway-to-bus or bus-to-subway transfers allowed without a MetroCard or OMNY.

Prior to May 16, 2025, there was one exception:

- At the Rockaway Parkway Intermodal Center on the BMT Canarsie Line (L train), westbound B6, B82 Local, and B82 Select Bus Service customers arriving from East New York and Canarsie, eastbound B6 Local customers on trips terminating at Rockaway Parkway, and all B42 customers, were transported directly into the subway system's fare control without having to pass through turnstiles (as the former trolley line had a loop installed within fare control). Similarly, subway passengers could transfer to B42 and westbound B6 and B82 Local service without using a MetroCard or OMNY (westbound B82 SBS customers must still obtain proof of payment, but have a second transfer to another route). The subway platform was enclosed with fencing and turnstiles to prevent fare evasion.

==== NYC Ferry ====
As NYC Ferry uses a separate fare payment system from the rest of New York City's transportation system, it does not provide any free transfers to any other modes of transportation using MetroCard or OMNY. However, passengers can request one free transfer to a connecting NYC Ferry route, valid within 90 minutes of the passenger boarding the first route. Tickets are checked prior to boarding, when the boat arrives at the station.

== Fare history ==
Below are the fares charged for single boardings on the transit lines and predecessors of the New York City Transit Authority (NYCTA). Different combinations of transfer privileges and the abolition of double fares to the Rockaways have altered these fares from time to time. Since July 4, 1997, massively increased transfer privileges and pass discounts have lowered the average real fare significantly. According to MTA figures, only 2.1% of rides are single-ride fares.

=== Subway and local buses ===
Historical fare for subway and local buses
Fare	Fare equivalent in 2025	Start date	End date	Notes
$0.05	$0.67–1.79	1904	July 1, 1948	
$0.10	$1.20–1.34	July 1, 1948	July 1, 1953)	Bus fare: $0.07 from 1948 until 1950 and $0.10 from 1950 until 1953
$0.15	$1.49–1.81	July 25, 1953	July 5, 1966	5th Avenue Bus line fare raised to 15 cents on January 1, 1954
$0.20	$1.66–1.98	July 5, 1966	January 3, 1970	
$0.30	$2.31–2.49	January 4, 1970	December 31, 1971	
$0.35	$2.09–2.69	January 1, 1972	August 31, 1975	Fare applied to MSBA/Long Island Bus from 1973; In December 1973, the MTA started trialing a program in which passengers could pay a single one-way fare to take round trips on the subway, buses, and railroads on Sundays. Since this resulted in higher ridership, the MTA expanded it to include Saturdays on September 6, 1975. The weekend half fare program remained in place through to May 17, 1980 when it was abolished.
$0.50	$1.95–2.99	September 2, 1975	June 27, 1980	
$0.60	$2.12–2.34	June 28, 1980	July 2, 1981	
$0.75	$2.32–2.93	July 3, 1981	January 1, 1984	
$0.90	$2.69–2.79	January 2, 1984	December 31, 1985	
$1.00	$2.60–2.94	January 1, 1986	December 31, 1989	
$1.15	$2.72–2.83	January 1, 1990	December 31, 1991	
$1.25	$2.64–2.87	January 1, 1992	November 11, 1995	
$1.50	$2.63–3.17	November 12, 1995	May 3, 2003	
$2.00	$3.00–3.50	May 4, 2003	June 27, 2009	
$2.25	$3.32–3.38	June 28, 2009	December 29, 2010	
$2.25	$3.11–3.32	December 30, 2010	March 2, 2013	$2.50 SingleRide MetroCard ticket fare
$2.50	$3.40–3.46	March 3, 2013	March 21, 2015	$2.75 SingleRide MetroCard ticket fare
$2.75	$2.91–3.74	March 22, 2015	August 19, 2023	$3.00 SingleRide MetroCard ticket fare
$2.90	$2.98–3.06	August 20, 2023	January 3, 2026	$3.25 SingleRide MetroCard ticket fare
$3.00	$3.00	January 4, 2026	present	

Although the subway and bus fare was supposed to be increased again in 2021, this was postponed after the federal Infrastructure Investment and Jobs Act provided short-term funding for the MTA.

==== Fare-free routes ====
Starting on May 1, 2022, the fare for the Q70 bus was waived while the New York state government studied alternatives to the planned AirTrain LaGuardia people-mover system.

As part of a pilot program by the MTA to make five bus routes free (one in each borough), the B60, Bx18, M116, Q4, and S46/96 were selected as fare-free routes in July 2023. The pilot program would last six to twelve months and buses would display a "Fare Free" sign, similar to the one used on the Q70. The pilot was only supposed to run from September 24, 2023 until March 30, 2024, but it was extended in March 2024 to run until further notice. Though ten U.S. Congress members requested in April 2024 that the state government provide additional funding for the fare-free pilot program, state lawmakers declined to reauthorize funding for the program. The fare-free pilot program ended on August 31, 2024.

Zohran Mamdani, a cosponsor of the 2023–2024 pilot program, proposed making all MTA buses free as part of his successful campaign for the 2025 New York City mayoral election. The proposal requires state government approval, but Governor Kathy Hochul has declined to support Mamdani's fare-free bus proposal, and any elimination of fares would put the MTA at risk of a credit rating downgrade without alternate funding. In 2026, the New York City Council instead proposed waiving bus and subway fares for low-income riders in the Fair Fares program; the council's final proposal, released that June, expanded Fair Fares but did not make trips free.

=== Express bus base fare ===
Historical fare for express buses
Fare	Fare equivalent in 2025	Start date	End date	Notes
$1.50	$5.86–8.97	1975	June 27, 1980	
$2.00	$7.82	June 28, 1980	?	
$3.00	$8.98	?	December 31, 1985	
$3.50	$9.09–10.28	January 1, 1986	December 31, 1989	
$4.00	$7.90–9.86	January 1, 1990	February 28, 1998	
$3.00	$5.25–5.93	March 1, 1998	May 3, 2003	
$4.00	$6.59–7.00	May 4, 2003	February 26, 2005	
$5.00	$7.38–8.24	February 27, 2005	December 29, 2010	
$5.50	$7.60–8.12	December 30, 2010	March 2, 2013	
$6.00	$8.15–8.29	March 3, 2013	March 21, 2015	
$6.50	$8.19–8.83	March 22, 2015	April 20, 2019	
$6.75	$7.13–8.50	April 21, 2019	August 19, 2023	MetroCard or OMNY only; coin payment discontinued
$7.00	$7.18–7.40	August 20, 2023	January 3, 2026	
$7.25	$7.25	January 4, 2026	present	

== Fare collection history ==
=== Token and change ===
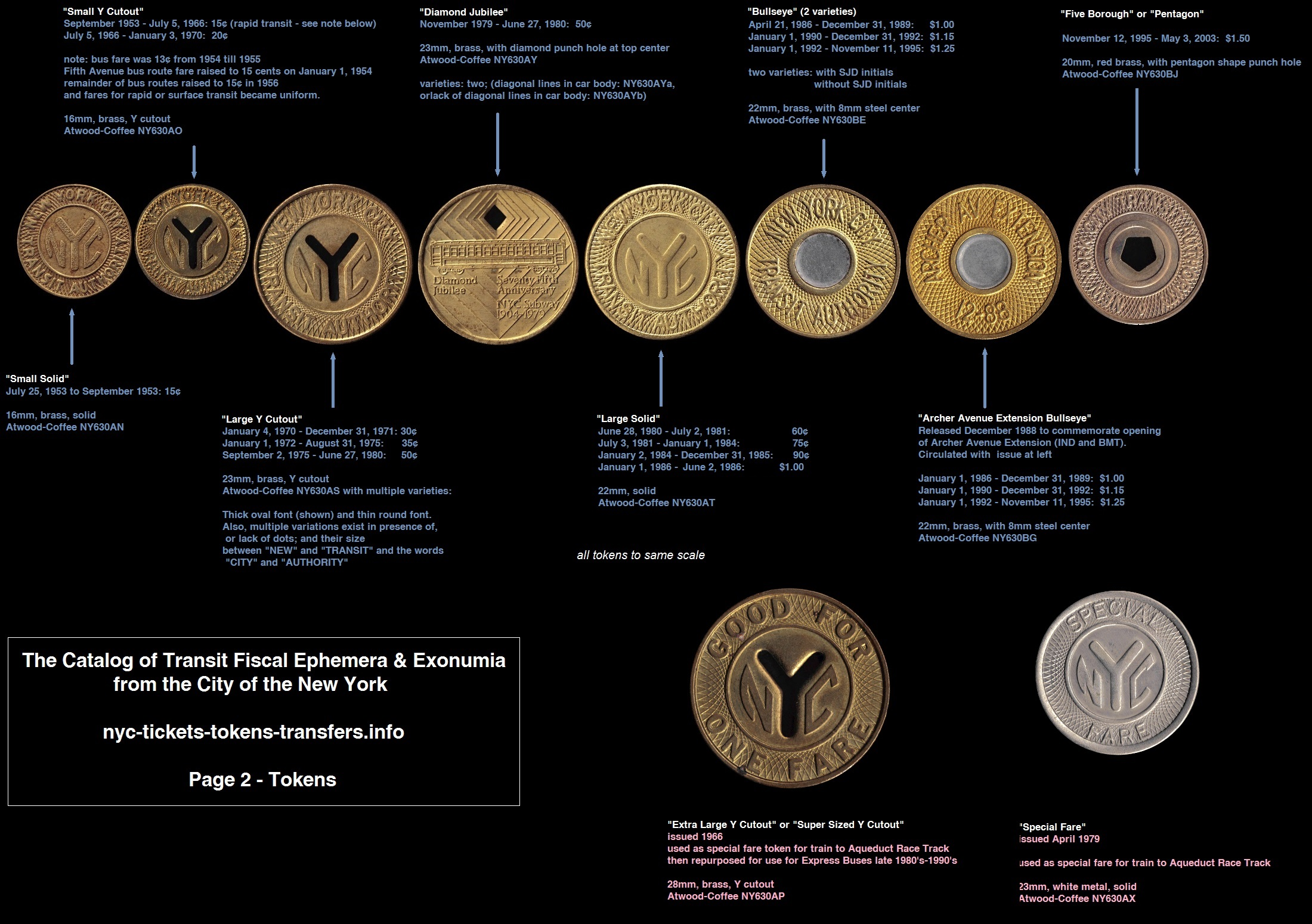
NYCTA tokens from 1953 through 2003 (minor die varieties not shown)

From the inauguration of IRT subway services in 1904 until the unified system of 1948 (including predecessor BMT and IND subway services), the fare for a ride on the subway of any length was 5 cents ($0.05 in 1904 equivalent to $1.79 in 2025; $0.05 in 1948 equivalent to $0.67 in 2025). On July 1, 1948, the fare was increased to 10 cents (equivalent to $1.34 in 2025) for rapid transit (subway and elevateds) and 7 cents for surface routes (streetcar and bus). It has risen steadily since then. When the New York City Transit Authority was created in July 1953, the fare was raised to 15 cents (equivalent to $1.81 in 2025) and a token was issued.

In 1970, the fare was raised to 30 cents. This token is 23 mm in diameter with a Y cut out, and is known as the "Large Y Cutout". The token did not always change with the fare: in 1972, when the fare increased from 30 to 35 cents, the MTA simply raised the prices of existing tokens (although a change in token size had been mulled). Another fare increase in 1980, which brought the fare from 50 to 60 cents, did result in the issuance of a token that was 1 mm smaller (i.e., 22 mm) of solid design (with no Y cutout), known as the "Large Solid" (as the 1953 solid was much smaller).

On August 31, 1969, exact fares in tokens or coins became required on buses, with bus operators no longer providing change to reduce robberies. Tokens or coins deposited would be locked in the fare box. Following the change, bus loading times were reduced by over 50 percent, traffic accidents were down by 25 percent since bus operators could focus on driving buses, and holdups of bus operators were reduced from about 50 per month to about zero.

For the 75th anniversary of the subway in 1979 (also called the Diamond Jubilee), a special token with a small off-center diamond cutout and engraved images of a 1904 subway car and kiosk were issued. Many were purchased as keepsakes and were not used for rides.

A new design of tokens was issued in April 1986, which was four months after a raise in fare. These "Bulls-eye" tokens have a 8 mm steel center that is magnetically attractive. There are three versions of this token: the first having minuscule SJD initials on the token, of which were surreptitiously placed in the design by a retiring director of revenue, Sylvester J. Dobosz; a second lacking the SJD initials, which were ordered removed by the NYCTA; and finally the "Archer Avenue Extension 12-88 Bulls-eye" to commemorate the opening of the Archer Avenue lines in Queens. The last iteration of tokens, which began use (they were sold prior to entering use) on November 12, 1995, featured a red brass-plated steel core with a pentagon-shaped punch hole in the center, known as the "Five Borough Token".

There are also two special fare tokens. The first is the brass "Extra Large Y Cutout"; with a 28 mm diameter, it is the largest subway token. It was issued in 1966, and was used briefly for the 75-cent Special Fare to Aqueduct Racetrack, at which time it was stored. It was then reissued to be used as fare payment for the Express Buses. The second special fare token is a 22 mm White Metal solid token. This token has SPECIAL FARE marked on the reverse and was also used for additional fare trains to Aqueduct Racetrack.

There had been issues with "slug" use from the second day of use of the very first token. Upon the introduction of the 16 mm "Small Solid" token on July 25, 1953, it was found that F. W. Woolworth Company sold a pack of 16 metallic play money coins for 10 cents, and the play money dimes activated the turnstile mechanism. Sidney H. Bingham, General Manager of the NYCTA, stayed up all night with a turnstile mechanism in the Times Square workshop making various adjustments. About 2 p.m. the following day, he was successful in finding the correct rejection parameters, and turnstile technicians were sent out to adjust the other turnstiles throughout the Transit System. Bingham was no stranger to the innards of a turnstile: his uncle was former IRT president Frank Hedley, who, with assistant James S. Doyle, had patented the first turnstile design for use on the IRT in 1921.

In the later era of token use, it was a common scam to circumvent the payment of fares by jamming the token slot in an entrance gate with paper. A passenger would insert a token into the turnstile, be frustrated when it did not open the gate, and have to spend another token to enter at another gate. A token thief would then suck the token from the jammed slot with their mouth. This could be repeated many times as long as no police officers spotted the activity. Some token booth attendants sprinkled chili powder in the slots to discourage "token sucking". Token sucking (also known as "stuff 'n' suck") was charged under theft of services, criminal tampering, and criminal mischief.

Token issues were compounded when transit riders discovered in the early 1980s that tokens purchased for use in the Connecticut Turnpike toll booths were of the same size and weight as New York City Subway tokens. Since they cost less than one third as much, they began showing up in subway collection boxes regularly. Connecticut authorities initially agreed to change the size of their tokens but later reneged, and the problem went unsolved until 1985, when Connecticut discontinued the tolls on its turnpike. At that time, the MTA was paid 17.5 cents for each of more than two million tokens that had been collected during the three-year "token war".

Tokens were sold until April 13, 2003, after which only MetroCards were used for fare payment. Tokens were phased out in 2003 when the fare rose to $2 (equivalent to $3.50 in 2025). Coins could still be used for fare payment on buses. In 2025, the MTA announced that coins would no longer be accepted for fare payment on buses starting some time in 2026.

=== MetroCard ===
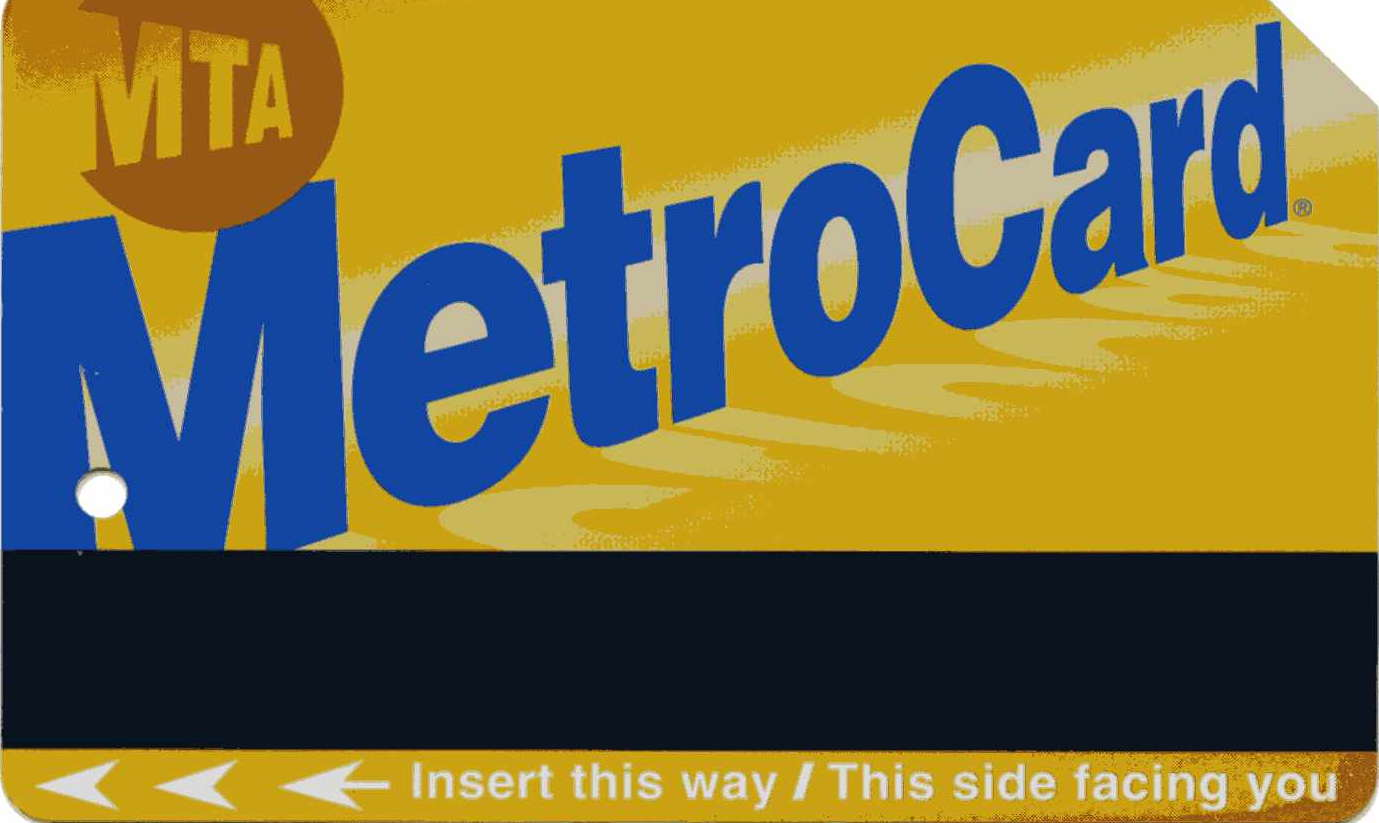
Front side of a MetroCard; these cards with yellow backgrounds were distributed from 1997 until their discontinuation in 2025.

On October 30, 1992, the installation of Automated Fare Collection turnstiles began. On June 1, 1993, MTA distributed 3,000 MetroCards manufactured by Cubic Transportation Systems in the first major test of the technology for the entire subway system and the entire bus system. Less than a year later, on January 6, 1994, MetroCard-compatible turnstiles opened at Wall Street on the IRT Lexington Avenue Line (4 and 5 trains) and Whitehall Street – South Ferry on the BMT Broadway Line (N, R, and W trains). All MetroCard turnstiles were installed by May 14, 1997, when the entire bus and subway system accepted MetroCard. On September 28, 1995, buses on Staten Island started accepting MetroCard, and by the end of 1995, MetroCard was accepted on all New York City Transit buses.

Before 1997, the MetroCard design was blue with yellow lettering. These blue cards are now collector's items. On July 4, 1997, the first free transfers were made available between bus and subway at any location with MetroCard. This program was originally billed as "MetroCard Gold". Card colors changed to the current blue lettering on goldenrod background. The first MetroCard Vending Machines (MVMs) were installed on January 25, 1999, in two stations, and by the end of 1999 347 MVMs were in service at 74 stations. On April 13, 2003, tokens were no longer sold. Starting May 4, 2003, tokens were no longer accepted, except on buses.

Two pilot programs were introduced to find a replacement to the MetroCard a few years after it was implemented. In the first, introduced in early 2006, the MTA signed a deal with MasterCard to test out a new RFID card payment scheme. Originally scheduled to end in December 2006, the trial was extended into 2007 due to "overwhelming positive response". In light of the success of the first PayPass pilot project in 2006, another trial was started by the MTA. This one started on June 1, 2010, and ended on November 30, 2010. The first two months started with the customer just using the MasterCard PayPass debit or credit card. However, this trial was the debut of having a rider use the VISA PayWave debit or credit card to enter the system, which started on August 1, 2010. For six months, a rider could use either a MasterCard Paypass or VISA PayWave credit/debit card to pay for a fare on an expanded list of subway and bus routes. MetroCard was officially discontinued on December 31, 2025.

=== OMNY ===
On October 23, 2017, it was announced that the MetroCard would be phased out and replaced by OMNY, a contactless fare payment system also by Cubic. OMNY accepted contactless bank cards and mobile payments (including Apple Pay, Google Pay, Samsung Pay, and Fitbit Pay), in addition to a dedicated OMNY card.

OMNY launched as an employee-only trial in February 2019 at 16 subway stations in Manhattan and Brooklyn. (Note: All stations on the 4, 5, and 6 services between Grand Central–42nd Street and Atlantic Avenue–Barclays Center) The system launched to the public on May 31, 2019, with the addition of Staten Island buses to the original 16 subway stations. Rollout was completed to all subway stations and MTA-operated buses on December 31, 2020. As of June 2021, OMNY only supported full-fare and reduced-fare rides, including transfers, and the accepted payment methods were contactless debit/credit cards, mobile payments and the OMNY Card. As of February 28, 2022, a Monday-to-Sunday weekly fare cap was implemented to provide unlimited rides after 12 fares were paid in a week. In August 2023, the Monday-to-Sunday fare cap was replaced with a 7-day cap. The first tap began a new 7-day cap regardless of what day that first tap occurred.

== Fare evasion ==
=== Turnstiles ===
New York City Subway fare gate featuring low turnstiles and tripod rods equiped with OMNY readers

The New York City Subway has four basic types of fare control equipment: low turnstiles (including agent-operated special entry turnstiles, SETs), high entrance-exit turnstiles (HEETs), high exit turnstiles (HXTs), and gates (including emergency exit gates (EXG), agent-operated gates (AOG), and Autonomous Farecard Access System (AFAS) gates for wheelchair access). Passengers enter the subway by swiping or tapping farecards to unlock the turnstiles. Typical control areas feature low turnstiles, one or more EXGs, and a token booth. Unstaffed entrances that were remodeled before the late 2000s featured only HEETs and EXGs. Exit-only locations have only HXTs and EXGs. All control areas must have at least one EXG, as per State emergency regulations.

Systemwide EXG installations since 2006 introduced a weakness into otherwise secure AFC systems. Gates were originally only unlocked via booths' buzzers or employees' keys. After London Underground's 2005 terrorism attacks, fire codes required "panic bars", allowing each gate to be opened from the paid side, expediting emergency evacuation. While a loud, piercing, and warbling alarm sounds whenever EXGs are opened, general public took to using gates for exiting (substantially reducing queues), especially at unstaffed locations. It happened so often that, in January 2015, the MTA silenced all exit alarms. In an attempt to reduce fare evasion, in May 2023, the MTA exhibited several designs for half-height and full-height Plexiglas turnstiles, which would replace the SETs. In early 2024, to discourage fare evasion, the MTA reconfigured emergency exits at three stations so the exits opened only after a 15-second delay. The MTA also allocated $1 billion in its 2025–2029 Capital Program to install new faregates at selected stations to deter fare evasion.

Per MTA fare tariff, exceptions to normal turnstile operations abound. Children under 44 inches (110 cm) (turnstile machines' top height) must crawl under when entering with fare-paying adults (not permissible when travelling alone). Those with bulk items (bicycles, strollers, packages) must request station agent witness their swiping farecard, rotating turnstile without entering, then enter through an AOG with their items. Passengers with paper half-fare or "block" tickets must relinquish them to the agent and enter through a SET. School groups traveling with authorization letters may be admitted through an AOG.

An added complication is several unofficial system entry methods resulting in no revenue loss but forbidden by tariff are frequently practiced. At unstaffed locations, fellow passengers often open EXGs for entry by customers with bulk packages after witnessing them rotate turnstiles without entering. Children often squeeze through HEETs with paying adults (if under 44", no revenue loss occurs). At token booths, agents often admit passengers through an AOG or SET for operational reasons. Police in uniform, construction workers, contractors in safety vests, employees, and concession vendors often enter with keys or agent's permission. Police officers or station agents sometimes allow student groups to enter through gates.

New York City Subway's modern wide-aisle fare gate located at Broadway-Lafeyette

The New York City Subway loss over $900 million from fare evasion, therefore fare gate improvement to keep the transportation running. The New York City Subway has implemented roughly 190 stations with an emergency exit door that requires a 15 second wait and sound alarms. With both the low turnstiles featuring tripod rods, and the HEET turnstiles reach from top to bottom, both have major issues. Low turnstiles feature low tripod rods which can easily be jumped over, and HEET turnstiles being heavy and clunky and violating major crowd safety hazard, with both being inaccesible for many disabilities. The New York City Subway proposed a new electric wide-aisle fare gate. It allowed accessibility with proper sensors, partially stopped piggy-backing, and just high enough to prevent jumping over and low enough from crawling under. The New York City Subway has successfully implemented these new subway gates to 20 stations, and plans on installing them on 150 stations.

=== History ===
New York City's transit system in the 1970s was in disarray. Subway ridership was declining, while private express buses mushroomed, exacerbating Transit Authority's (TA) problems. Crime was rampant; derailments, fires, breakdowns, and assaults were commonplace. Trains and stations were covered in graffiti. Passengers were actually afraid to ride the subway. To attract passengers, TA even introduced a premium fare "Train to the Plane"—staffed by a transit police officer at all times. Comparatively, fare evasion seemed a small problem. However, fare evasion was causing the TA to lose revenue.

The TA's strategy for restoring riders' confidence took a two-pronged approach. In 1981, MTA's first capital program started system's physical restoration to a State-of-Good-Repair. Improving the TA's image in riders' minds was as important as overcoming deferred maintenance. Prompt removal of graffiti and prevention of blatant fare evasion would become central pillars of the strategy to assure customers that the subway is "fast, clean, and safe". The last graffiti came off the subway cars in 1989.

Similarly, fare evasion was taken seriously. The TA began formally measuring evasion in November 1988. When TA's Fare Abuse Task Force (FATF) was convened in January 1989, evasion was 3.9%. After a 15-cent fare increase to $1.15 in August 1990, a record 231,937 people per day, or 6.9%, did not pay. This continued through 1991.

To combat the mounting problem, FATF designated 305 "target stations", with the most evaders, for intensive enforcement and monitoring. Teams of uniformed and undercover police officers randomly conducted "mini-sweeps", swarming and arresting groups of evaders. Special "mobile booking centers" in converted citybuses allowed fast-track offender processing. Fare abuse agents covered turnstiles in shifts and issued citations. Plainclothes surveyors collected data for five hours per week at target locations, predominantly during morning peak hours. Finally, in 1992, evasion began to show a steady and remarkable decline, dropping to about 2.7% in 1994.

The dramatic decrease in evasion during this period coincided with a reinvigorated Transit Police, a 25% expansion of the NYPD police, and a general drop in crime in U.S. cities. In the city, crime rate decline begun in 1991 under Mayor David Dinkins and continued through next two decades under mayors Rudolph Giuliani and Michael Bloomberg. Some observers credited the "broken windows" approach to law enforcement where minor crimes like evasion are routinely prosecuted, and statistical crimefighting tools, whereas others have indicated different reasons for crime reduction. Regardless of causality, evasion checks resulted in many arrests for outstanding warrants or weapons charges, likely contributing somewhat to public safety improvements. Arrests were not the only way to combat evasions, and by the early 1990s NYCTA was examining methods to improve fare control passenger throughputs, reduce fare collection costs, and maintain control over evasions and general crime. The AFC system was being designed, and evasion-preventing capability was a key consideration.

TA's queuing studies concluded that purchasing tokens from clerks was not efficient. Preventing 'slug' use required sophisticated measures like tokens with metal-alloy centers and electronic token verification devices. To provide better access control, the NYCTA experimented with floor-to-ceiling gates and "high-wheel" turnstiles. Prototypes installed as a "target hardening" trial at 110th Street/Lexington Avenue station reduced evasions compared to nearby "control" stations. However, controls consisting entirely of "high wheels" created draconian, prison-like environments, with detrimental effects on station aesthetics. Compromises with more secure low-turnstile designs were difficult, as AFC did not prevent fare evasion.

Production automated fare collection (AFC) implementation began on January 6, 1994. New turnstiles, including unstaffed high wheels, and floor-to-ceiling service gates, featured lessons learned from trials. As AFC equipment was rolled out, evasion plummeted. Fare abuse agents, together with independent monitoring, were eliminated.

In December 2018, in the midst of a transit crisis, the MTA announced that as many as four percent of subway riders and 16 percent of bus riders each day might not be paying fares, amounting to 208,000 subway riders and 384,000 bus riders per day. In response, Byford stated that the MTA was studying ways to physically prevent fare evaders from jumping over subways turnstiles, or entering the rear doors of buses where they did not need to pay.

In the final quarter of 2023, the MTA reported 13 percent of subway riders and 45 percent of bus riders had fare evaded, up from 5 percent and 20.6 percent, respectively, in 2019.

=== Station agents ===
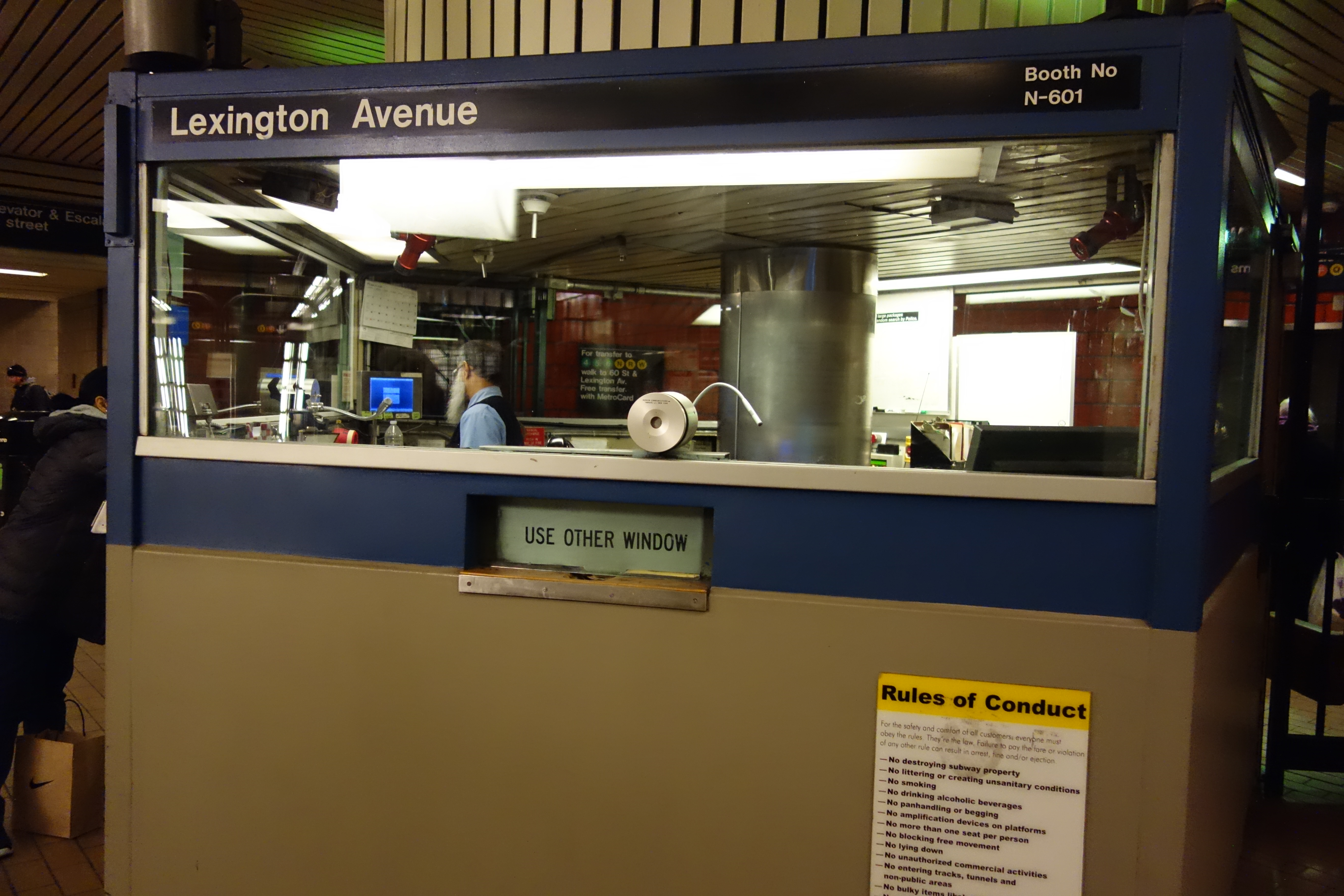
Token booth seen at Lexington Avenue–63rd Street

The MTA had tried to reduce station agent positions since full MetroCard vending machine (MVM) deployment in 1997. Agents, whose primary responsibility was selling tokens, now sell MetroCards. However, AFC eliminated long token-booth queues, so fewer clerks were needed. Passengers now interact with agents only for requests like mutilated farecards, concessionary fares, or travel directions. Clerks were not cross-trained for AFC maintenance; that function was assigned to turnstile maintainers. The MTA determined that each station required only one full-time booth, serving dominant (or both) travel directions. Some booths were removed altogether because it was felt that MVMs would be sufficient.

Some thought the station destaffing plan would lead to potential evasion increases, and consequently more general crime. The original FATF (1988–1997) was reconvened in 2009 to review trends and coordinate mitigation strategies between MTA and New York City Police Department (NYPD)'s Transit Bureau. Further confusing the issue, agents themselves historically provided evasion counts in their normal course of duty.

Decision to eliminate agents turned out controversial with both riding public and elected officials. Representatives were concerned about constituents' jobs, whereas riders were concerned about susceptibility to crime.

A 2004 compromise converted low-volume booths to high-wheel, high-volume booths to part-time entrances called "kiosks" (51) staffed by Station Customer Assistants (SCAs). Affectionately called "burgundy jackets", SCAs do not sell farecards, instead they walk around solving customers' issues, including fare machine usage.

Agents' presence in the stations is disputed. A civil suit concerning the 2005 sexual assault at the 21st Street and Jackson Avenue station, which occurred despite the alarm having been raised by the agent. However, an agent saved a life in Cathedral Parkway–110th Street in 2010.

The 2009 fiscal crisis necessitated more agent reductions, leaving only one 24-hour booth per station complex. Planned attrition program was converted to layoffs when fiscal situation deteriorated further in 2010.

The only stations of the NYC subway which do not have 24-hour booths, although open 24/7, are the five stations of the IRT Dyre Avenue Line (5 train): Eastchester-Dyre Avenue, Baychester Avenue, Gun Hill Road, Pelham Parkway, and Morris Park. These stations are staffed only 15 hours a day. Additionally, Coney Island-Stillwell Avenue station does not have a station agent, but does have a 24/7 Customer Service Center, located at a retail area within the complex.

=== Prevention techniques ===
==== Configuration ====
In studies, gate evasion rate was found to be 1.5% unlocked, and only 0.8% when locked. Unlocked gates also invite more "questionable" entries; rate was 1.8% unlocked, but only 0.9% locked. Keeping gates locked potentially halves gate-related evasions. Following this finding, MTA reinstructed station supervisors and agents on importance and revenue impacts of keeping gates locked. Questionable gate entries decreased from 1.5% to 0.4% following this change, but illegal gate entries did not show statistically significant decrease when seasonality effects were accounted for. This measure seems to target mostly casual evasions.

Originally fare control hardware and staff presence was thought to affect evasions. Unstaffed HEETs (with emergency exits), a generally unsupervised environment, might invite rampant evasions. However, pilot studies indicated these locations had similar gate evasions (0.9%) to staffed locations (1.0%). At least in New York, agents do not seem to deter evaders. Unsupervised HEETs had similar turnstile evasions (1.2%) to staffed locations (1.0%). Unsupervised exit-only locations have lower gate evasions (0.6%) than elsewhere, suggesting evasion is a crime of opportunity. Exit-only gates are only opened when trains arrive and passengers open them from the paid side; evaders likely find it more time-efficient to evade through entrances. Only the most determined evaders would wait at exit-only locations for others to exit, to enter.

==== Passenger height ====
Passengers may be unaware of height guidelines determining when children must begin to pay, which were posted at booths that many customers no longer use. Prototype signs are being tested near turnstiles at the Bowling Green station, and a sign also exists at the 81st Street–Museum of Natural History station.

==== Vandalism ====
MVM vandalism costs MTA both in lost revenues and repair expenses. MTA provides MVM vandalism intelligence to NYPD, which utilizes hidden portable wireless digital video cameras in "sting" operations to gather evidence against organized fare abuse rings and identify leaders. These "professional swipers" can be difficult to apprehend because they are very mobile and require strategic and determined law enforcement efforts to monitor MVM vandalism patterns, prioritizing stations with the highest vandalism rates.

In years past, theft-of-service crimes were often dismissed with time served (several days in Riker's Island), but by working with the Manhattan District Attorney's Office and Midtown Community Court, FATF achieved escalating sentences for recidivists. The coordinated efforts resulted in a five-swiper ring being disbanded and sentences of over one year being imposed. Measuring impacts of taking down fare abuse operations is difficult, because even large swiper rings 'sell' very few fares compared to natural day-to-day fluctuations of the eight million riders on NYC's system due to reasons like weather or special events.

==== Legal framework and enforcement ====
The most important evasion fighting tool is arguably comprehensive and functioning legal frameworks to deal with evaders and counterfeiters. MTA's Rule of Conduct (62) has banned evasions since the 1980s, rules having been established mainly for arresting persons likely to commit other crimes (assault, graffiti). With appropriate legal framework, like traffic stops, evasion checks can be effective in identifying and arresting criminals wanted on outstanding warrants.

To round-up evaders, MTA fare inspectors continue to use the "surge" strategy first developed by Transit police. Renewed enforcement interests led to several high-profile cases. Swiss tourists with allegedly valid passes were ticketed for bumping turnstiles. One passenger was arrested for exiting through an emergency gate, even though he was not evading a fare.

Legal framework is more than prohibition of illegal acts and prescription of fines. Complete regulations should address issues like: arrests versus summonses; arresting/summons issuing powers; whether undercover enforcement is permitted; disputes/appeals process (e.g. "my monthly MetroCard isn't working, so I went through the gate"); dealing with genuinely confused tourists (e.g. "I flashed my pass, so going through the gate is okay?"); required evidence for conviction (e.g. whether video evidence are admissible). New York allows certain non-police employees to issue evasion citations, and utilizes both uniformed and undercover police enforcement.

==== Fines ====
MTA's $60 penalty was internally set by Transit Adjudication Bureau (TAB) with delegated powers. NYCT increased fines to $100 in July 2008, the maximum TAB can levy without further approvals, to support conversion to Proof-of-Payment (POP) fare collection for the Select Bus Service.

Since January 1, 2025, fare evasion violations committed in a four-year period face a warning with no fine for the first offense, $100 fine for the second offense but its timely full payment gets an OMNY credit, or $150 fine or a criminal summons for the third offense and up.

==== Other preventative measures ====
There are also uniformed guards, undercover police officers, and turnstiles to prevent fare evasion on the subway. On Select Bus Service, a penalty fare may need to be paid.

== See also ==
- Pizza Principle, the connection between single-ride fares and a slice of pizza in New York City
