= OMNY =

Public transit payment system in the New York City area

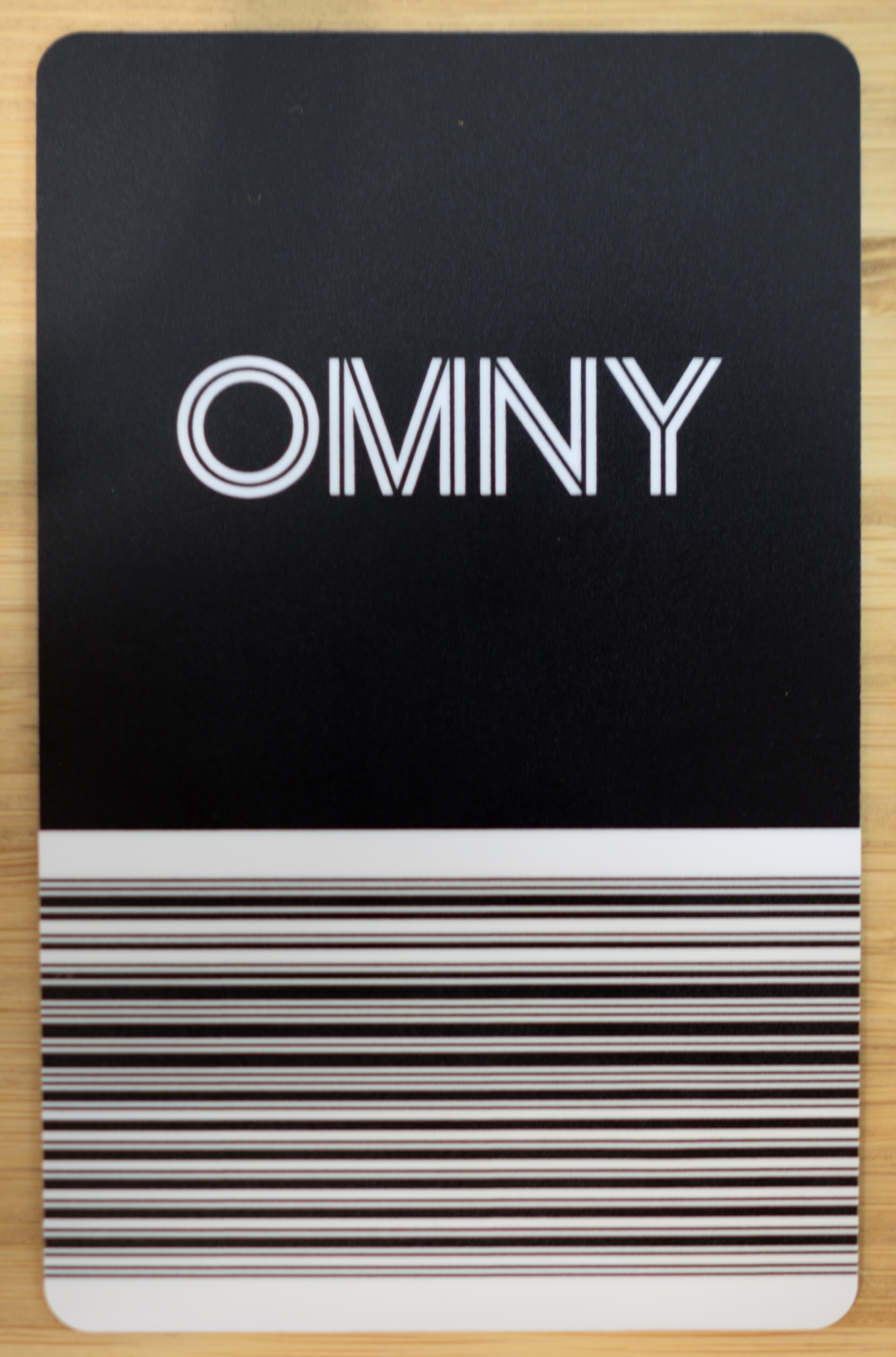
- Long name: One Metro New York
- Location: New York metropolitan area
- Launched: May 31, 2019; 7 years ago
- Predecessor: MetroCard
- Technology: Near-field communication (NFC); Contactless payment
- Generation: First
- Operator: Cubic Transportation Systems
- Manager: Metropolitan Transportation Authority
- Currency: USD ($1 minimum load)
- Stored-value: $1–300
- Credit expiry: 7 years
- Auto recharge: Yes
- Unlimited use: Yes
- Validity: MTA bus routes; New York City Subway; Staten Island Railway; Roosevelt Island Tram; Airtrain JFK; Hudson Rail Link; NICE buses; Bee-Line buses
- Variants: OMNY Card; Reduced-Fare OMNY (RF); Student Pass OMNY; Fair Fares OMNY (FFOC); Access-A-Ride (AAR)/(PCA)
- Website: omny.info

OMNY (/ˈɒmni/ OM-nee, short for One Metro New York) is a contactless fare-payment system that has been implemented for use on public transit in the New York metropolitan area. OMNY can be used to pay fares at all New York City Subway and Staten Island Railway stations, on all MTA buses, AirTrain JFK, Metro North's Hudson Rail Link, the Roosevelt Island Tram, Bee-Line buses, and NICE buses. There have been plans to expand OMNY to include the Long Island Rail Road and Metro-North Railroad.

OMNY replaced the MetroCard, a magnetic stripe card. Two limited contactless-payment trials were conducted around the New York City area in 2006 and in 2010. However, formal planning for a full replacement of the MetroCard did not start until 2016. The OMNY system is designed by Cubic Transportation Systems, using technology licensed from Transport for London's Oyster card. The system accepts payments through contactless bank cards and mobile payments as well as physical OMNY cards. OMNY began its public rollout in May 2019; the Staten Island Railway received OMNY readers in December 2019, and rollout on the New York City Subway and on MTA buses was completed on December 31, 2020.

The MTA began offering OMNY contactless cards on October 1, 2021, and introduced fare capping on February 28, 2022. Reduced-fare customers were allowed to use OMNY starting in June 2022 using their own debit or credit cards which must be registered with OMNY. Reduced Fare OMNY cards were expected to be issued in late 2023, but were not rolled out until December 2024. Another form of Reduced Fare OMNY cards, given to low income residents through the Fair Fares program, became available in February 2025. Full deployment to other New York City-area transit systems had been expected by 2023 but has been delayed. The phasing out of the MetroCard—originally expected in 2023—has been delayed indefinitely, but sales and distribution of the MetroCard ended on December 31, 2025.

== Predecessors ==
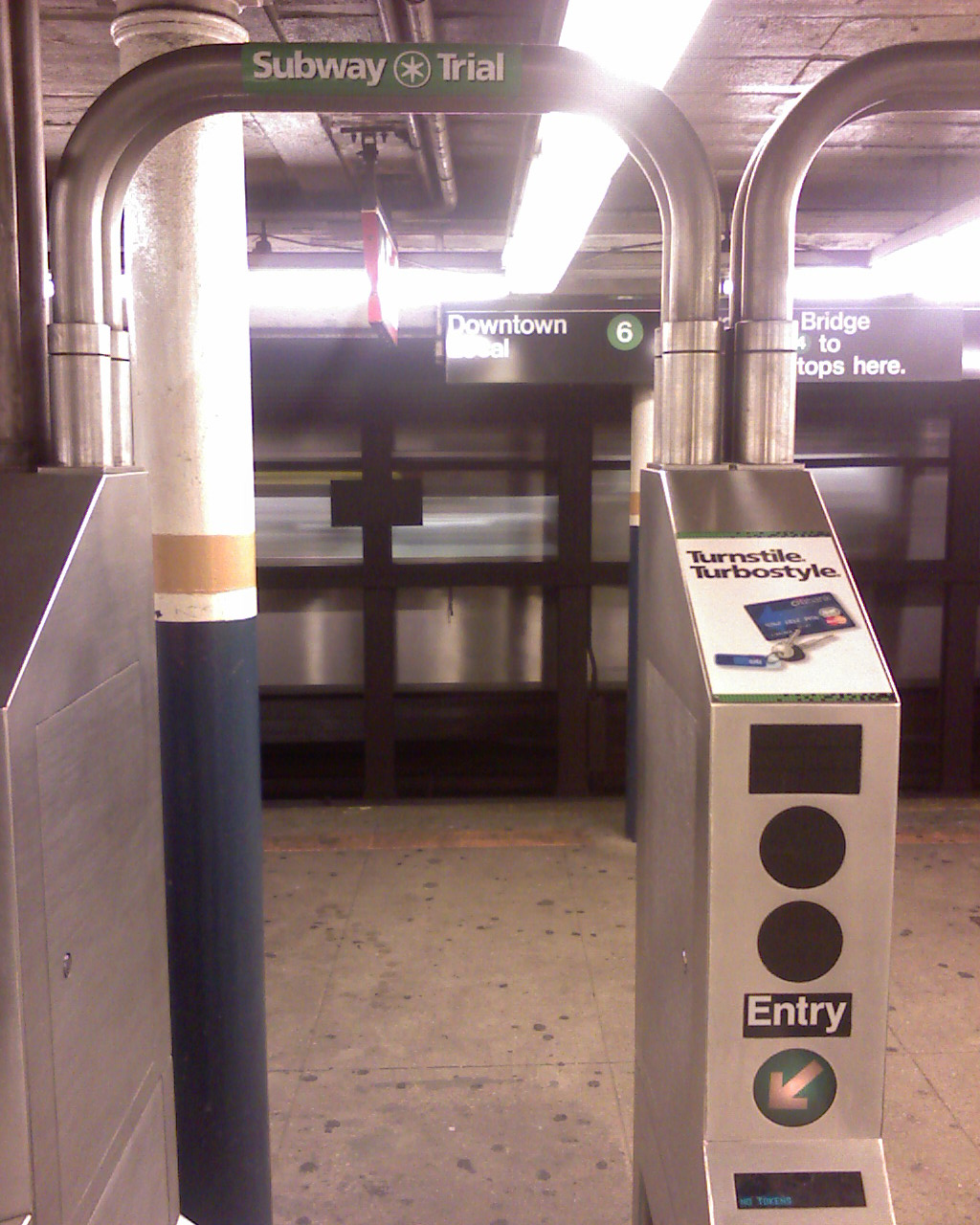
Contactless trial on the IRT Lexington Avenue Line, 2007

Subway tokens had been used for fare payment in New York City since 1953. Starting in 1992, they were replaced by MetroCards made by Cubic Transportation Systems, which used magnetic stripes to encode the fare payment. By 2003, tokens had been completely phased out. The MetroCard, a magnetic stripe card, was first introduced in 1993 and was used to pay fares on MTA subways and buses, as well as on other networks such as the PATH train.

In 1994 the MTA formed the MetroCard Company, a venture to explore development of a joint transit/financial services payment card. The technology and business relationships weren't ready, but the effort started to lay the foundation for thinking about fare systems as part of open-loop financial payment systems.

In 2000, the Port Authority of New York and New Jersey sponsored a feasibility study for a contactless regional fare card, which was conducted by the Volpe National Transportation Systems Center of the U.S. Department of Transportation. In 2001, the Port Authority Board of Commissioners approved a new fare system for the Port Authority Trans Hudson, which was seen as a first step toward an integrated regional fare payment system.

Mastercard and Citibank funded a trial of contactless payments, branded as PayPass. The trial was conducted at 25 subway stations, mostly on the IRT Lexington Avenue Line, (Note: The following subway stations participated in the 2006 trial: 23 stations on the IRT Lexington Avenue Line from 125th Street to Bowling Green; Borough Hall/Court Street in Brooklyn; 23rd Street-Ely Avenue in Queens) beginning in July 2006. The trial was limited to select Citibank cardholders, but it proved popular enough to be extended past its original end date of December 2006.

In light of the success of the first contactless payment trial in 2006, another trial was conducted from June to November 2010. The 2010 trial initially only supported MasterCard-branded cards, expanding to Visa PayWave cards in August. The 2010 trial eventually expanded to include multiple Manhattan bus routes, two New Jersey Transit bus routes, and most PATH stations. (Note: The following bus routes and subway stations participated in the 2010 trial: the IRT Lexington Avenue Line (4, 5, 6, and <6> trains) from 138th Street–Grand Concourse or Third Avenue–138th Street stations in the Bronx to Borough Hall station in Brooklyn, the M14, M23, M79, M86, M101, M102, M103 New York City Transit local bus routes, and the BxM7 MTA Bus express bus route, most of the PATH train stations (except for Christopher Street and Ninth Street), #6 (Ocean Avenue – Journal Square), #80 (Newark Avenue), and #87 (King Drive) New Jersey Transit bus routes.; A new route service was added at an unknown date: Passengers could use the Newark Liberty International Airport's AirTrain monorail system to terminals A, B, and C and the long-term parking areas of the airport. However, this was only good for going to the airport, away from the Newark Liberty International Airport Station, and did not apply when leaving the airport, toward the station.; Two options were available during this second trial for fare payment: "pay-as-you-go" RFID card scan at select turnstiles or locations; or, pre-funded fares via a pilot website called the "NY/NJ Transit Trial" for multiple and unlimited ride discounts. Pre-funded fares ceased to be available on the trial website on October 16, 2010, and the free trial ended on November 30, 2010.)

== Proposal ==
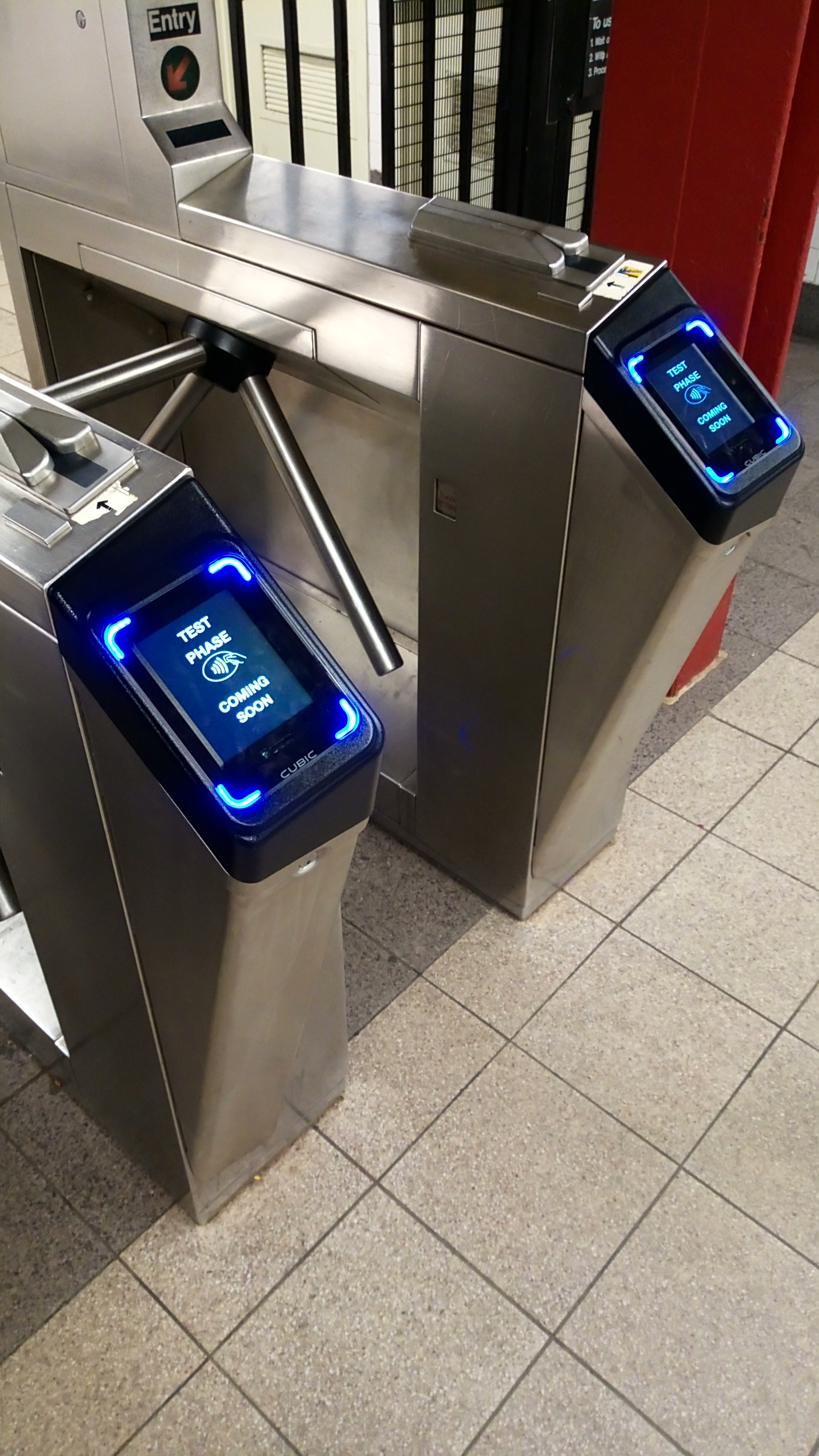
OMNY readers at Canal Street, 2019

In 2016, the MTA announced that it would begin designing a new contactless fare payment system to replace the MetroCard. The replacement system was initially planned for partial implementation in 2018 and full implementation by 2022. In October 2017, the MTA started installing eTix-compatible electronic ticketing turnstiles in 14 stations in Manhattan. The eTix system, already used on the Long Island Rail Road and Metro-North Railroad, allows passengers to pay their fares using their phones. The system would originally be for MTA employees only.

On October 23, 2017, it was announced that the MetroCard would be phased out and replaced by a contactless fare payment system also by Cubic, with fare payment being made using Android Pay, Apple Pay, Samsung Pay, debit/credit cards with near-field communication enabled, or radio-frequency identification cards. The announcement called for a phased rollout, culminating in the discontinuation of the MetroCard by 2023. The payment system would use technology licensed from Transport for London's Oyster card. Critics responded to the proposals with concerns about security and privacy, highlighting a 2016 security breach of fare systems in San Francisco.

== Implementation ==
In June 2018, the MTA revised the timeline for implementation of the then-unnamed new payment system. The first stage of implementation would take place in May 2019. In the second stage, all subway stations would receive OMNY readers by October 2020, in preparation for the third stage, which involved the launch of a prepaid OMNY card by February 2021. The fourth stage involved the installation of OMNY vending machines by March 2022, and the MetroCard would be discontinued in 2023. Installation of OMNY vending machines in stations would be pushed back to the summer of 2023, with the discontinuation of MetroCards cancelled as further delays arise with rollout on regional rail and affiliate agencies.

Initially, there were disagreements about what the payment system should be called; some executives wanted a "traditional" name that resembled the MetroCard's name, while others wanted more unusual names. Possible names included "MetroTap", "Tony", "Liberty", and "Pretzel". The name "OMNY" was eventually chosen as being "modern and universal". The OMNY name was announced in February 2019. "OMNY" is an acronym for "One Metro New York", intended to signify its eventual broad acceptance across the New York metropolitan area. However, goals for broad acceptance have since been hampered, with PATH and NJ Transit unwilling to install OMNY, instead pursuing similar independent systems which would not be compatible with it.

An internal trial launched in March 2019, involving over 1,100 MTA employees and 300 other participants. Over 1,200 readers were installed in subway stations and buses for the public trial, and the OMNY.info website was created. Weeks before the beginning of the public launch, $85.4 million had been spent on the project, out of a total budget of $644.7 million. The budget had risen to $677 million by June 2020 and to $732 million by November 2020. The budget was $772 million by June 2021.

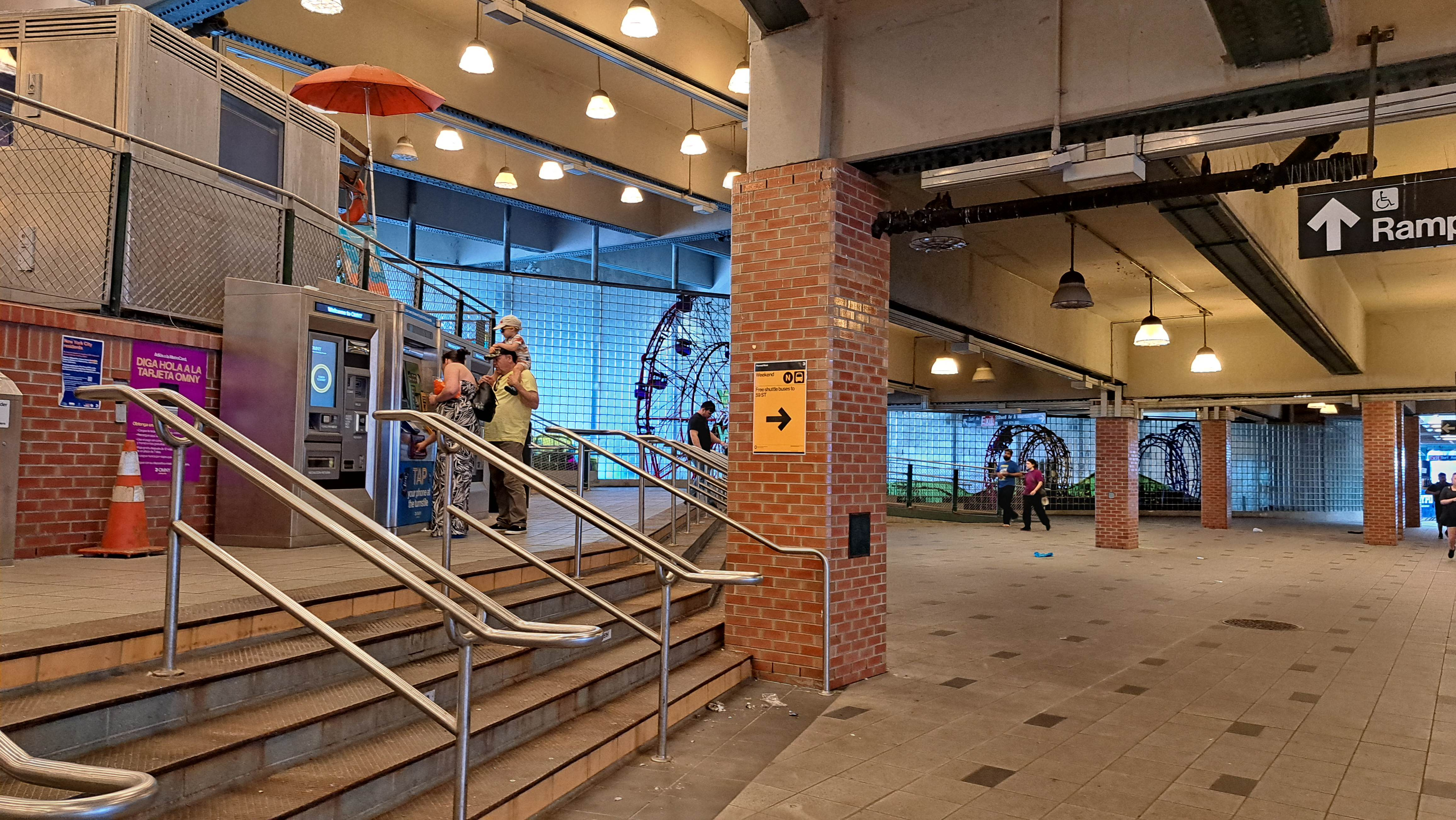
OMNY machines at the Coney Island-Stillwell Avenue station

=== Buses and rapid transit ===
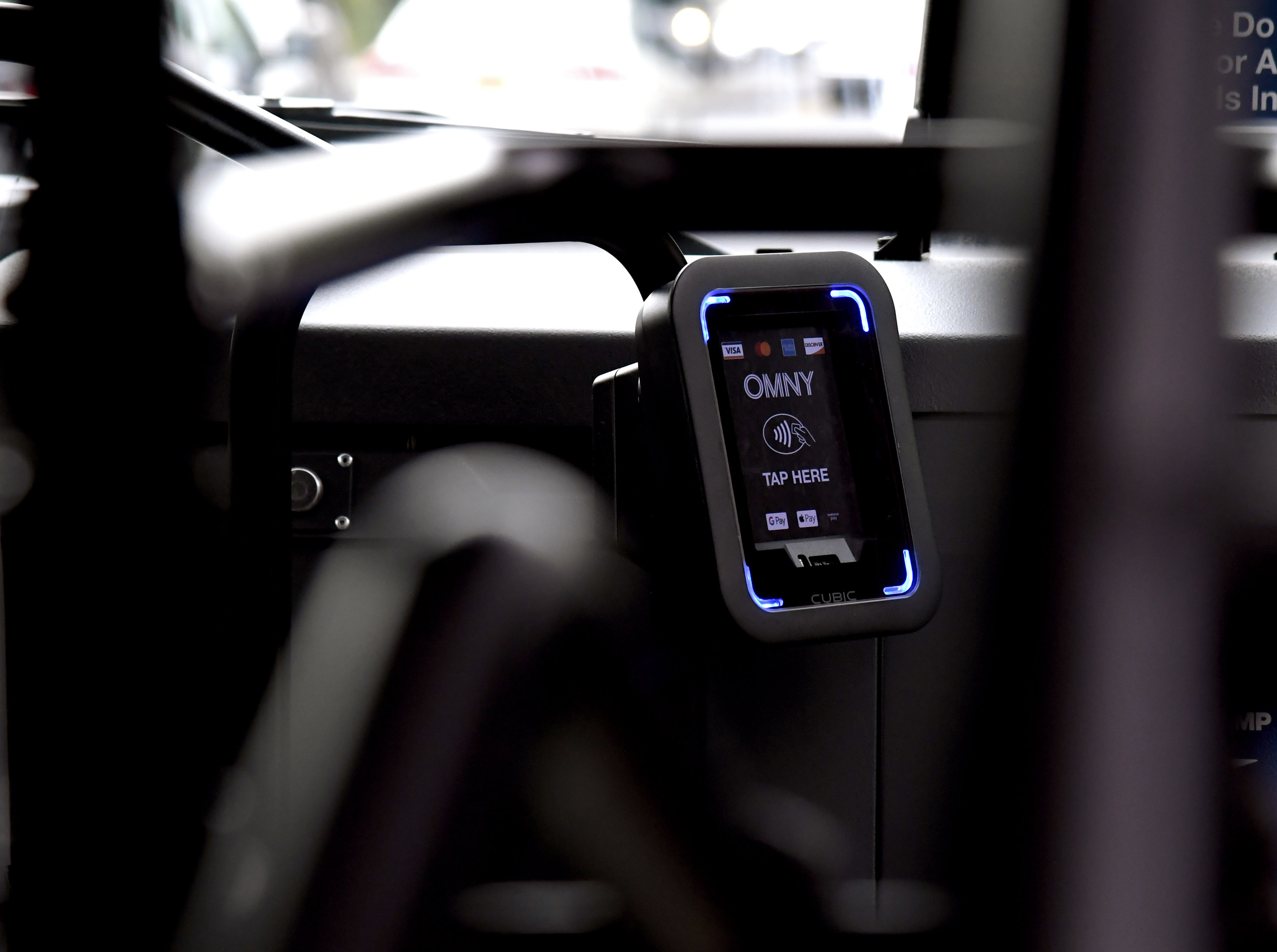
Staten Island buses were among the first to utilize OMNY readers.

At a presentation in May 2019, the MTA's Capital Program Oversight Committee specified the following items to be implemented at an unspecified future date: launch a mobile app, allow customers to pay with OMNY Cards on Access-a-Ride paratransit vehicles, and add OMNY readers on Select Bus Service buses to support all-door boarding. However, the committee expressed concerns that some bank cards would not be accepted, and that OMNY transactions could take longer than MetroCard transactions, increasing crowding at turnstiles. All-door boarding at Select Bus Service routes with OMNY began on July 20, 2020.

==== Rollout ====
OMNY launched to the public on May 31, 2019, on Staten Island buses and at 16 subway stations. (Note: All stations on the 4, 5, 6, and <6> trains between Grand Central–42nd Street and Atlantic Avenue–Barclays Center were in the initial OMNY pilot.) Turnstiles with OMNY readers displayed one of 11 screens, based on whether the OMNY payment was successful and whether the readers were functioning properly. At first, OMNY only supported single-ride fares paid with contactless bank cards; mobile payments such as Apple Pay and Google Pay were also accepted, and free transfers between OMNY-enabled routes were available with the same transfer restrictions placed upon the MetroCard. In June and July 2019, Mastercard offered "Fareback Fridays" to promote the system, where it would refund up to two rides made using OMNY on Fridays. The OMNY system reached one million uses within its first 10 weeks and two million uses within 16 weeks. On one day in June, 18,000 taps were recorded from bank cards issued in 82 countries.

In November 2019, the MTA announced its first expansion. Over the following month, 48 additional stations would be outfitted with OMNY readers the following month, thereby bringing the system to all five boroughs, (Note: See § Timeline for a list of additional stations.) and by January 2020 the system would then be expanded to Manhattan bus routes. Furthermore, the MTA would begin launching pilot programs on Select Bus Service, the city's bus rapid transit system, and add self-service features. OMNY readers were installed at the rear doors of buses. By then, over three million riders with bank cards from 111 countries had used OMNY. According to an internal MTA report, these riders had used over 460,000 unique payment methods between them, or about 2,000 new payment methods per day.

With the implementation of OMNY on the Staten Island Railway in December 2019, public transit in Staten Island became fully OMNY-compatible. The next month, MTA officials announced that OMNY had seen its five millionth use, and also that it would expand to 60 more subway stations by the end of the month. In addition, the MTA launched a marketing campaign for OMNY. After another expansion the next month, there were over 180 OMNY-equipped stations and OMNY had been used over 7 million times. This grew to 10 million uses by the time yet another expansion was announced in March.

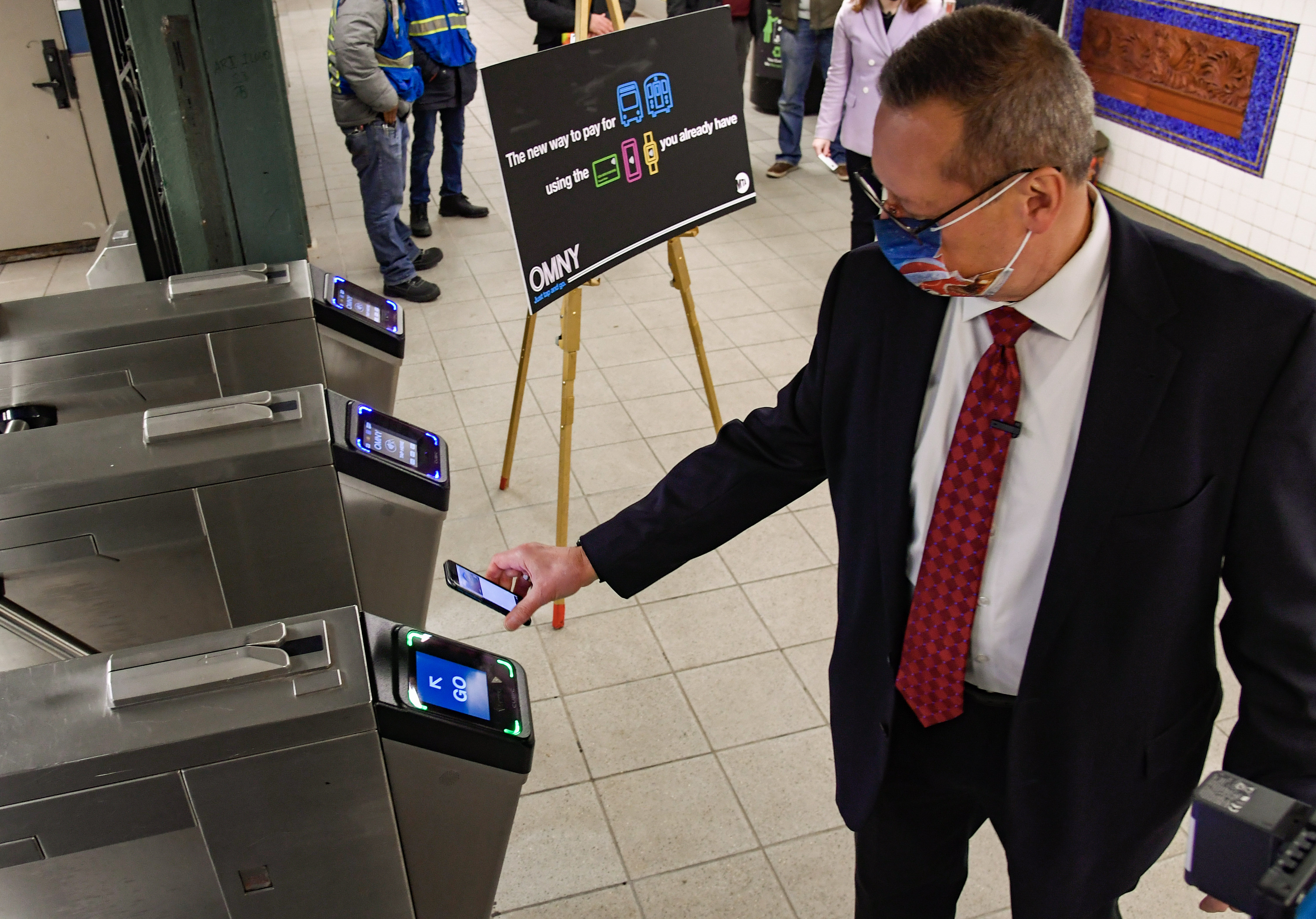
The final New York City Subway station to receive OMNY readers was Eastern Parkway–Brooklyn Museum

No new OMNY installations were added from March to June 2020 due to the COVID-19 pandemic in New York City. The pandemic delayed the target date for which OMNY would be implemented at all subway stations and MTA bus routes, which was pushed back from October to December 2020. OMNY installation in Manhattan was completed in July 2020. By that September, two-thirds of subway stations were OMNY-equipped; this included all stations in the Bronx, Manhattan, and Staten Island, as well as buses in the latter two boroughs. In November 2020, OMNY readers were installed at AutoGates, where disabled riders could enter and exit the system. By December, OMNY had been rolled out to 458 subway stations, representing 97% of the total, and OMNY had been used 30 million times. On December 31, 2020, the MTA announced that OMNY was active on all MTA buses and at all subway stations, after the last OMNY readers were activated at Eastern Parkway–Brooklyn Museum station.

==== Post-rollout ====
By July 2021, one-sixth of all fares paid on the bus, subway, and Staten Island Railway were being paid through OMNY, and 100 million fares had been paid using the fare system. Reduced pay-per-ride OMNY fares were supposed to become available in mid-2022. Reduced-fare OMNY was finally activated in October 2022, although it was not available to Fair Fares riders and students. The MTA indicated in September 2023 that OMNY usage was highest in gentrified areas with young, white, and well-off populations. At the time, OMNY was being used for 47% of subway rides and 30% of bus rides.

Although local buses all had OMNY readers at their rear doors, none of them were in use by early 2024, in part because, in an attempt to reduce fare evasion, the MTA had ordered bus drivers to open the buses' rear doors only for alighting passengers. In May 2024, a small number of people enrolled in the MTA's Fair Fares program (which gave discounted fares to low-income residents) were allowed to begin using discounted OMNY cards as part of a pilot program. By then, 55% of subway rides and 34% of bus rides were being paid for using OMNY.

By December 2024, reduced-fare OMNY cards for seniors and disabled riders (including Access-a-Ride customers) were ready to be distributed, while the Fair Fares OMNY card had yet to be rolled out. New Fair Fares customers began receiving OMNY cards from February 2025 onward; existing customers could either switch to an OMNY card immediately or continue to use their MetroCard until it expired. That month, the MTA announced that it would spend $4.5 million to repair OMNY fare readers on buses because the fare readers kept detaching. In March 2025, the MTA announced that sales and distribution of the MetroCard would end that December. The MTA announced the next month that Apple Wallet would support virtual OMNY cards starting later that year. In addition, as part of its contract with Cubic, the MTA spent millions of dollars to develop a chatbot to assist OMNY users. In July 2025, the MTA reported that 75% of fare-paying riders used OMNY and that customer satisfaction was largely positive despite widespread reports of glitches. When the MetroCard was finally retired, OMNY users accounted for up to 94% of bus and subway fares.

=== Regional rail ===
As of 2019, the MTA also plans to use OMNY on the Long Island Rail Road and Metro-North Railroad over "the next several years". In June 2019, the Port Authority of New York and New Jersey announced it was in talks with the MTA to implement OMNY on the PATH by 2022. This would be called off in 2021 with PATH pursuing a separate new fare system that is also designed by Cubic. There are no plans for OMNY to be used on NJ Transit, which plans to implement a new fare payment system with a different contractor by late 2024.

Plans for OMNY installation on the LIRR and Metro-North were still being revised as of November 2020. The COVID-19 pandemic had pushed back the implementation of fare cards on the commuter railroads from February 2021 to June 2022, and that of in-system vending machines from March 2022 to June 2023. As of June 2021, there were delays in the commuter railroads' mobile ticketing system as well as vending machines. According to the MTA's independent engineering consultant, this could potentially delay full rollout of OMNY for six months from the original projected completion date of July 2023. By February 2022, the rollout of OMNY on the LIRR was pushed back to between 2023 and 2024. As of 2024, OMNY has not been rolled out on MTA commuter rail. On January 29, 2024, the Metro-North Railroad's Hudson Rail Link began accepting OMNY. In May 2024, the MTA announced that it would hire two existing contractors, rather than Cubic, to implement OMNY on the LIRR and Metro-North.

=== Other agencies ===
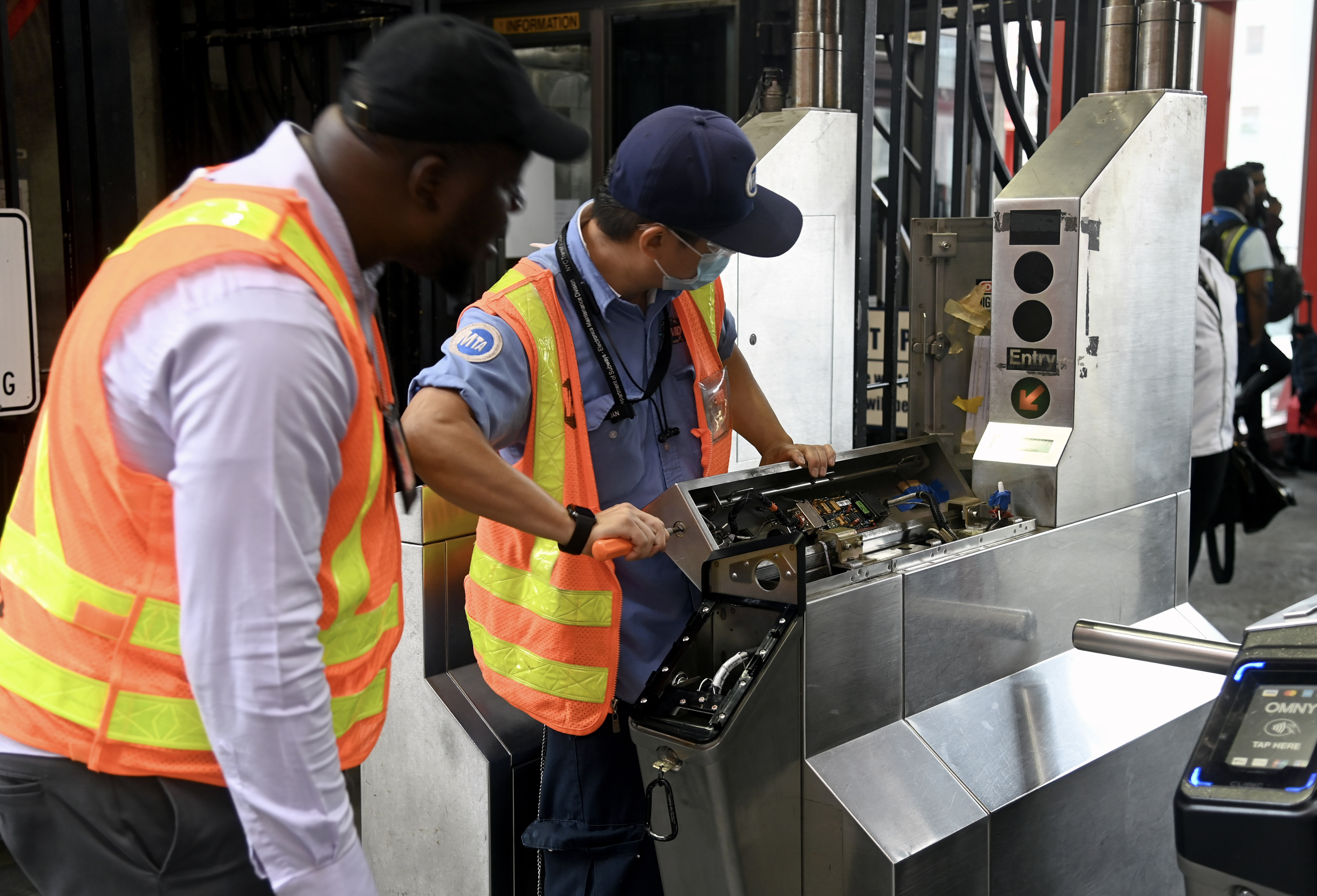
OMNY installation on Roosevelt Island Tram turnstiles

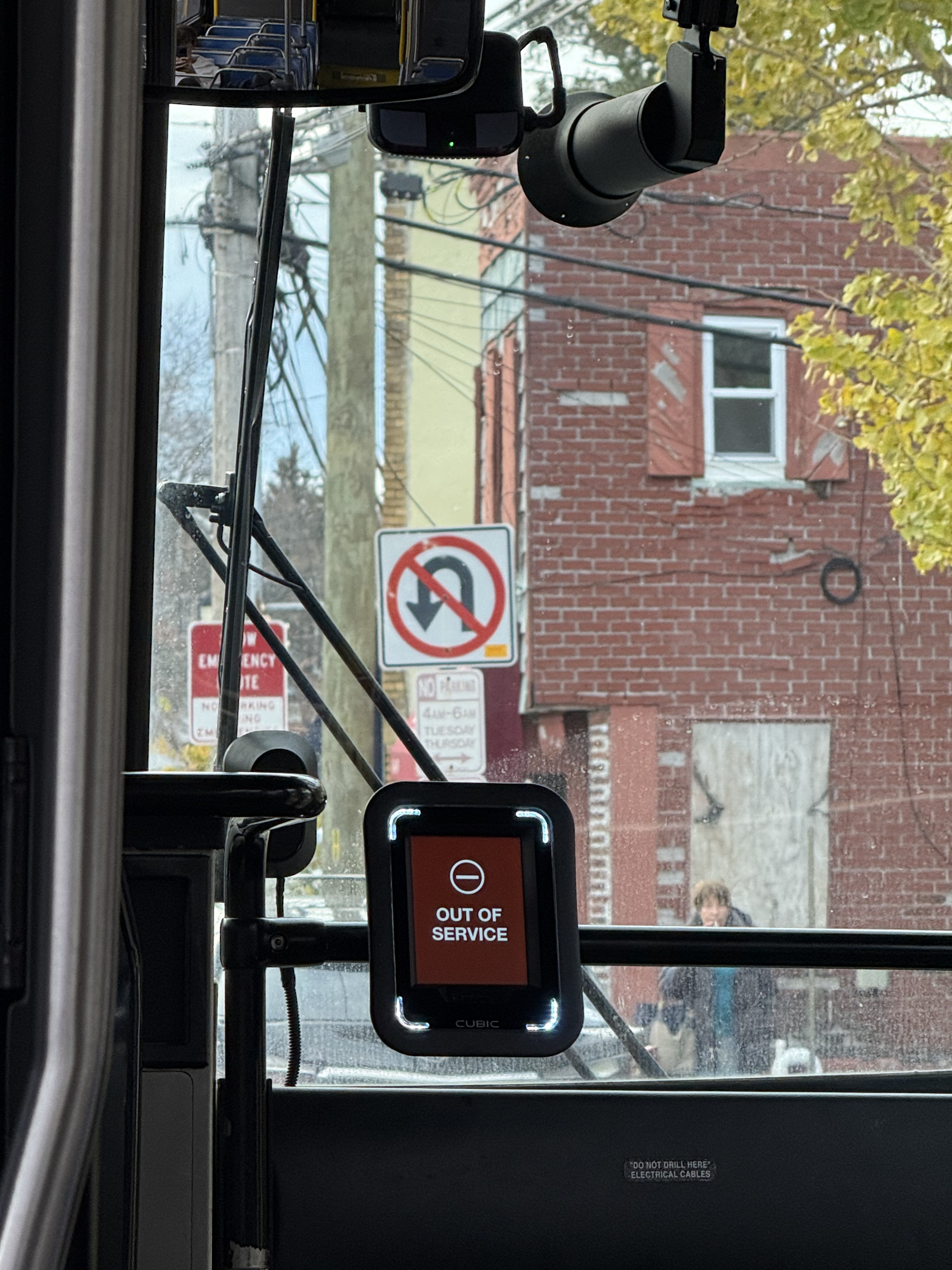
Out of Service OMNY reader on a NICE N23 Bus to Manorhaven

As part of the rollout, OMNY replaced MetroCard on affiliate agencies. Rollout to faregates on the AirTrain JFK was planned to occur in 2023, replacing the MetroCard payment requirement to use the system. Installation of OMNY readers on the AirTrain JFK and Roosevelt Island Tramway was underway by mid-2023. On August 24, 2023, the Roosevelt Island Tramway started to accept OMNY. In early October 2023, governor Kathy Hochul announced that the AirTrain JFK would start accepting OMNY on October 10, although some turnstiles would continue to accept MetroCards only.

Rollout of OMNY to Westchester County's Bee-Line Bus System and the Nassau Inter-County Express (NICE) was delayed until the MTA announced in early 2025 that the MetroCard would be discontinued. Westchester County's Bee Line and Nassau County's NICE bus system activated OMNY on January 4, 2026.

=== Timeline ===
This list shows when direct entry by OMNY reader became possible on each bus line, train/subway segment, or tramway line.

Line	Stations	Primary services	Date
IRT Eastern Parkway Line	Borough Hall/Court Street, Nevins Street, Atlantic Avenue–Barclays Center	"2" train "3" train "4" train "5" train	May 2019
IRT Lexington Avenue Line	Bowling Green to Grand Central–42nd Street	"4" train "5" train "6" train "6" express train	May 2019
Staten Island local and express bus routes			May 2019
BMT Fourth Avenue Line	86th Street/4th Avenue	"R" train	December 2019
BMT/IND Archer Avenue lines	Sutphin Boulevard–Archer Avenue–JFK Airport	"E" train "J" train "Z" train	December 2019
IND Eighth Avenue Line	34th Street–Penn Station	"A" train "C" train "E" train	December 2019
IRT 42nd Street Shuttle	Times Square and Grand Central (Note: De facto implementation, as OMNY has been implemented on all stations that include this line.)	42nd Street Shuttle	December 2019
IRT Broadway–Seventh Avenue Line	South Ferry/Whitehall Street to 59th Street–Columbus Circle	"1" train "2" train "3" train	December 2019
IRT Jerome Avenue Line	138th Street–Grand Concourse to Woodlawn	"4" train	December 2019
IRT Lexington Avenue Line	Lexington Avenue/51st–53rd Streets to 125th Street	"4" train "5" train "6" train "6" express train	December 2019
Staten Island Railway	St. George and Tompkinsville (Note: These are the only two Staten Island Railway stations with turnstiles.)	Staten Island Railway	December 2019
IND Sixth Avenue Line	47th–50th Streets–Rockefeller Center to Broadway–Lafayette Street	"B" train "D" train "F" train "F" express train "M" train	January 2020
IRT Broadway–Seventh Avenue Line	66th Street–Lincoln Center to Van Cortlandt Park–242nd Street	"1" train "2" train "3" train	January 2020
IND Eighth Avenue Line	Inwood–207th Street to High Street	"A" train "B" train "C" train "D" train "E" train	January 2020
Multiple	Jay Street–MetroTech	"A" train "C" train "F" train "F" express train "R" train	January 2020
Multiple	Seventh Avenue	"B" train "D" train "E" train	January 2020
IRT White Plains Road Line	Third Avenue–149th Street to Wakefield–241st Street	"2" train "5" train	February 2020
IRT Pelham Line	Third Avenue–138th Street to Pelham Bay Park	"6" train "6" express train	February 2020
Manhattan bus routes			March 2020
IND Fulton Street Line	Hoyt–Schermerhorn Streets to Euclid Avenue	"A" train "C" train	March 2020
IRT Broadway–Seventh Avenue Line	Wall Street and Clark Street	"2" train "3" train	March 2020
IRT Dyre Avenue Line	Morris Park to Eastchester–Dyre Avenue	"5" train	March 2020
IRT Eastern Parkway Line	Hoyt Street	"2" train "3" train	March 2020
IRT Flushing Line	Mets–Willets Point and Flushing–Main Street	"7" train "7" express train	March 2020
IRT Lenox Avenue Line	110th Street–Malcolm X Plaza to Harlem–148th Street	"2" train "3" train	March 2020
BMT Astoria Line	Queensboro Plaza to Astoria–Ditmars Boulevard	"N" train "W" train	June 2020
BMT Broadway Line	49th Street to Fifth Avenue–59th Street	"N" train "Q" train "R" train "W" train	June 2020
BMT Franklin Avenue Line	Prospect Park to Park Place	Franklin Avenue Shuttle	June 2020
IND Rockaway Line	Howard Beach–JFK Airport	"A" train	June 2020
IND Sixth Avenue Line	York Street	"F" train "F" express train	June 2020
IRT Flushing Line	34th Street–Hudson Yards to 111th Street	"7" train "7" express train	June 2020
63rd Street lines	Lexington Avenue–63rd Street	"M" train "Q" train	By the end of June 2020
IND Second Avenue Line	72nd Street to 96th Street	"Q" train	By the end of June 2020
IND Concourse Line	155th Street to Norwood–205th Street	"B" train "D" train	July 2020 (Note: In July 2020, all stations in the Bronx were equipped with OMNY. The only line where this had not been installed yet was the Concourse Line. The entire A Division (numbered routes) was equipped with OMNY readers, except for the Eastern Parkway–Brooklyn Museum of the IRT Eastern Parkway Line, which was undergoing renovations at the time.)
IND Queens Boulevard Line	Fifth Avenue/53rd Street to Grand Avenue–Newtown	"E" train "F" train "F" express train "M" train "R" train	July 2020
IRT Eastern Parkway Line	Hoyt Street to Crown Heights–Utica Avenue	"2" train "3" train "4" train "5" train	July 2020
IRT New Lots Line	Sutter Avenue–Rutland Road to New Lots Avenue	"3" train "4" train	July 2020
IRT Nostrand Avenue Line	President Street to Flatbush Avenue–Brooklyn College	"2" train "5" train	July 2020
Manhattan local bus routes			July 2020
IND 63rd Street Line	Roosevelt Island and 21st Street–Queensbridge	"F" train "M" train	August 2020
BMT Canarsie Line	Third Avenue to Bedford Avenue	"L" train	August 2020
IND Queens Boulevard Line	Woodhaven Boulevard to Jamaica–179th Street	"E" train "F" train "F" express train "M" train "R" train	August 2020
BMT/IND Archer Avenue lines	Jamaica–Van Wyck and Jamaica Center–Parsons/Archer	"E" train "J" train "Z" train	August 2020
BMT Nassau Street Line	Broad Street and Bowery	"J" train "Z" train	August 2020
IND Sixth Avenue Line	Second Avenue to East Broadway, Grand Street, and 57th Street	"B" train "D" train "F" train "F" express train "M" train	August 2020
BMT Canarsie Line	Lorimer Street to Canarsie-Rockaway Parkway	"L" train	September 2020
BMT Jamaica Line	Marcy Avenue to 121st Street	"J" train "M" train "Z" train	September 2020
IND Culver Line	Bergen Street to Smith–Ninth Streets	"F" train "F" express train "G" train	September 2020
BMT Myrtle Avenue Line	Central Avenue to Metropolitan Avenue	"M" train	October 2020
Multiple	DeKalb Avenue	"B" train "Q" train "R" train	October 2020
IND Crosstown Line	21st Street to Fulton Street	"G" train	October 2020
IND Culver Line	Fourth Avenue/Ninth Street to Coney Island–Stillwell Avenue	"F" train "F" express train "G" train	October 2020
BMT Brighton Line	Seventh Avenue to Avenue J	"B" train "Q" train	October 2020
Bronx local bus routes			October 2020
BMT Brighton Line	Avenue M to Ocean Parkway	"B" train "Q" train	November 2020
IND Fulton Street Line	Grant Avenue to Ozone Park–Lefferts Boulevard	"A" train	November 2020
IND Rockaway Line	Aqueduct Racetrack to Far Rockaway–Mott Avenue	"A" train	November 2020
IND Rockaway Line	Beach 90th Street to Rockaway Park–Beach 116th Street	Rockaway Park Shuttle	November 2020
BMT Fourth Avenue Line	Union Street to Bay Ridge-95th Street	"D" train "N" train "R" train	November 2020
BMT West End Line	Ninth Avenue to 79th Street, Bay 50th Street	"D" train "R" train "W" train	November 2020
IRT Eastern Parkway Line	Eastern Parkway–Brooklyn Museum	"2" train "3" train	December 2020
BMT West End Line	18th Avenue to 25th Avenue	"D" train "R" train "W" train	December 2020
BMT Sea Beach Line	8th Avenue to 86th Street	"N" train	December 2020
Queens and Brooklyn bus routes			December 2020
Roosevelt Island Tramway			August 2023
AirTrain JFK			October 2023
Hudson Rail Link			January 2024
Bee-Line Bus System			January 2026
Nassau Inter-County Express			January 2026

== OMNY card ==
In October 2021, the MTA started selling a physical OMNY card at certain retail locations throughout New York City. The MTA planned to expand the rollout to vending machines inside stations in September 2022. OMNY cards featuring commemorative designs, as well as special fare-classes such as students, senior citizens, and MTA employees, were not available at the time of the standalone OMNY Card rollout. The physical card was seldom used in the months after its rollout; by February 2022, less than 1 percent of all OMNY fares were being paid using a card, and 4,367 cards had been sold at stores. On October 30, 2023, OMNY machines were activated at six subway stations. By the end of 2025, every subway station and approximately 2,700 stores sold OMNY cards.

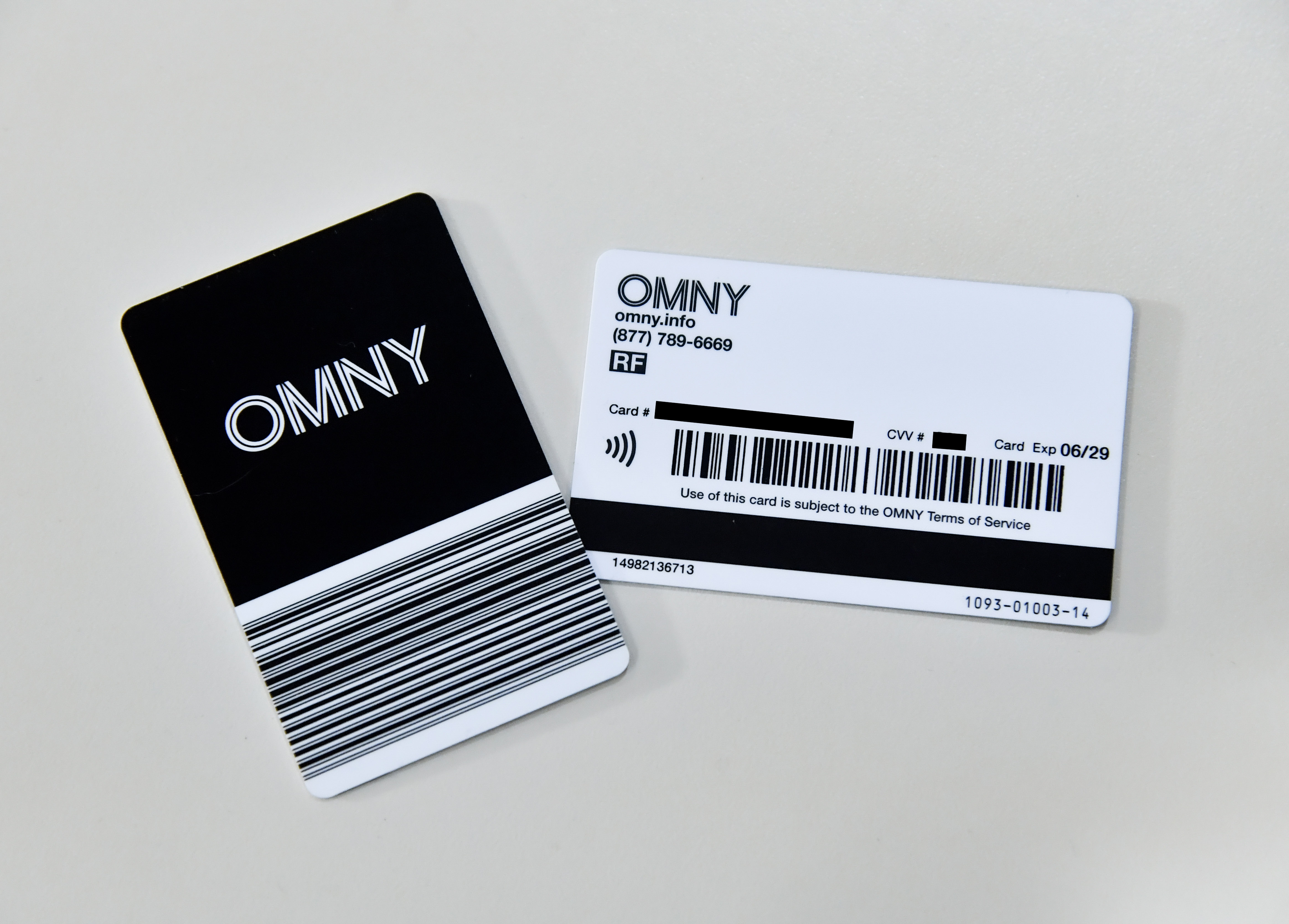
Front and back of a reduced-fare OMNY card

The card is thicker than the MetroCard it replaced, and valid for seven years from purchase. It can be purchased or reloaded from retailers such as CVS, Walgreens, 7-Eleven, and Duane Reade stores, as well as bodegas, CFSC Check Cashing, and dollar stores that previously sold MetroCards. OMNY can also be purchased and refilled directly from vending machines at subway stations. It contains two barcodes on the front and back; one barcode is used to record the card being purchased, and the other is used to encode fare information. On the standard card, half of the front side contains a barcode, which is oriented to resemble railroad tracks, while the other half of the front side contains a white-on-black OMNY logo. The back of the card contains the card number, card security code, expiration date, and the other barcode. Variants of the card are also planned for MTA employee fares as well as limited edition versions. OMNY cards use NFC type A, and the cards are MIFARE DESFire EV2. The cost of the card is $1.00 plus a minimum of $1 to be loaded on the card at time of purchase.

=== Reduced-fare and student cards ===
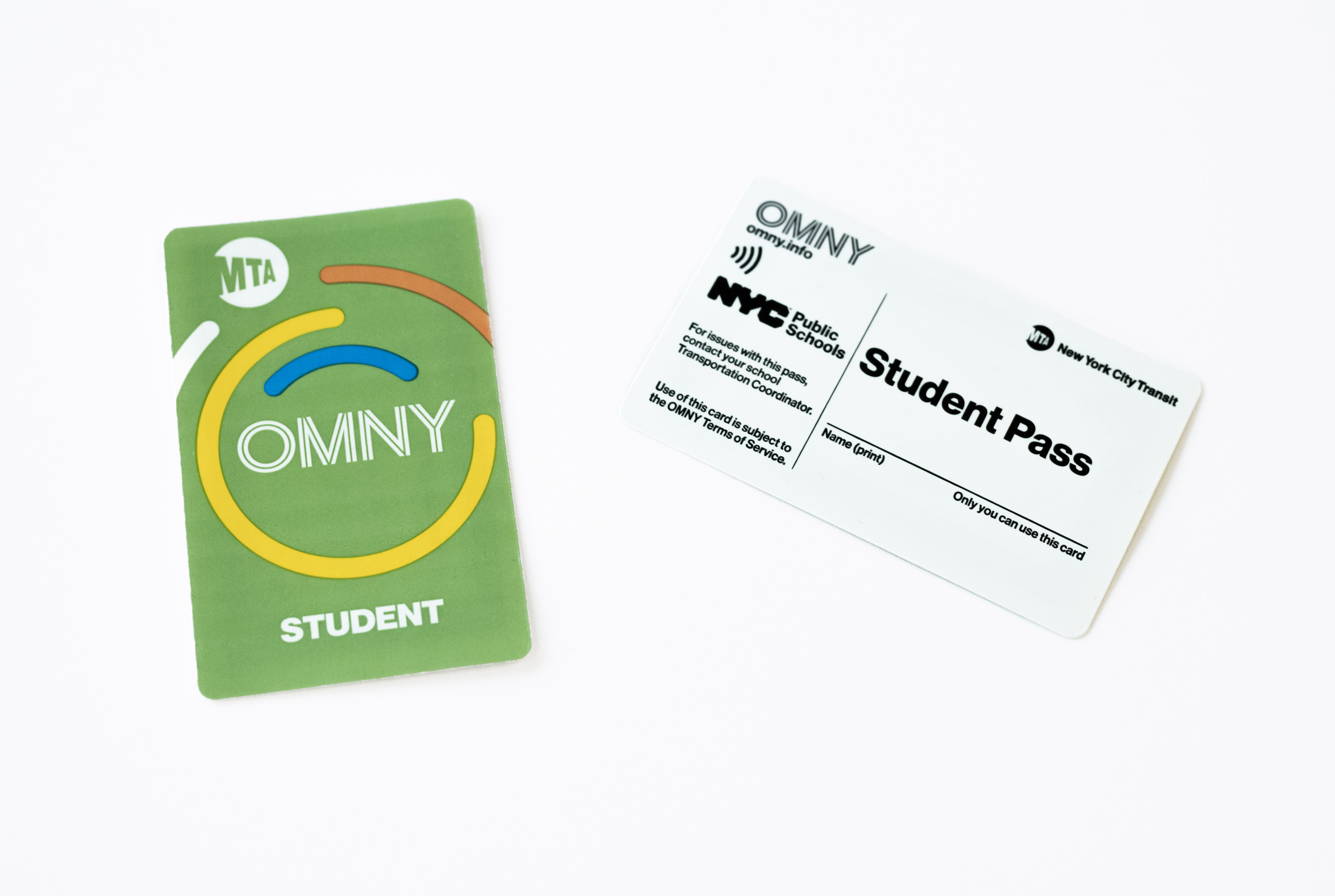
Front and back of a student OMNY card

Even at the end of 2021, reduced pay-per-ride OMNY fares were not available at all. The MTA announced in May 2024 that students and reduced-fare MetroCard users would begin receiving OMNY cards later that year. The first students were issued OMNY cards on September 5, 2024. The cards were initially not issued to students who lived within 0.5 miles (0.80 km) of their schools. Student cards are made of a thinner material than regular OMNY cards. Following complaints about the student cards, the MTA announced plans to allow students to pay using smartphones and to use a sturdier material for the cards, though neither plan had been implemented as of 2026.

On December 13, 2024, OMNY Reduced Fare cards were released for seniors and disabled patrons. In February 2025, OMNY began distributing reduced fare cards to low-income riders through the Fair Fares NYC program. With the discontinuation of MetroCards in December 2025, all remaining reduced-fare MetroCard users were to be given OMNY cards, although elderly reduced-fare riders reported difficulties obtaining their cards. OMNY cards for Access-a-Ride customers differ slightly from standard and other reduced-fare cards. The back of the card displays a photo of the recipient, their AAR ID number and an abbreviation logo of (P|PCA) if the recipient requires a personal care attendant. In June 2026, Mayor Zohran Mamdani and the NYC Council approved student OMNY cards for 1,250 City University of New York students, which provide 75 trips each.

In 2026, the MTA announced a trial for student cards with harder plastic. The MTA also began trialing digital cards for students. Initially the virtual card plan had been scheduled to start in 2025.

== Fares ==
=== Fare media ===
MetroCard is accepted on MTA Regional buses, the New York City Subway, Metro North's Hudson Rail Link, the Staten Island Railway, Roosevelt Island Tramway, AirTrain JFK, and Nassau Inter-County Express. Local MTA bus routes and NICE and Bee-Line buses also accept coins (though pennies and half-dollars are not accepted on Select Bus Service routes), while MTA buses, Hudson Rail Link, the Roosevelt Island Tram, Airtrain JFK, the subway, Nassau Inter-County Express, Bee-Line Bus, and the Staten Island Railway also accept OMNY. Westchester Bee-Line Bus accepts also accepts dollar bills of $1, $2, $5, and $10 as payment, but does not allow MetroCard as payment. As of January 2026, customers cannot buy or refill a MetroCard.

PATH only accepts TAPP (a clone of OMNY); however, TAPP cannot be used on any other transit system in New York City. PATH accepted MetroCards and SmartLink (a fare card) until September 1, 2026. The subway, Roosevelt Island Tram, the Staten Island Railway, and express buses only accept MetroCard and OMNY as payment.

As of December 31, 2020, all subway stations, the Staten Island Railway, (Note: St. George and Tompkinsville are the only stations on the Staten Island Railway where fares are collected to enter and exit.) and all MTA-operated buses are equipped with OMNY readers. As of January 2026, the only unlimited option available on OMNY is the 7-day fare cap, and 30-day options were discontinued except on Airtrain JFK.

	MetroCard	Coins	OMNY	TAPP
MTA local buses (Note: Including Limited-Stop and Select Bus Service buses.)	check	(Note: No half-dollar coins or pennies accepted on Select Bus Service buses.)	check	X mark
MTA express buses	check	X mark	check	X mark
NYC Subway	check	(Note: Cash is accepted for purchasing fare media at stations.)	check	X mark
Staten Island Railway	check	X mark	check	X mark
PATH	X mark	X mark	X mark	check
Roosevelt Island Tramway	check	X mark	check	X mark
AirTrain JFK	check	X mark	check	X mark
Nassau Inter-County Express	check	check	check	X mark
Westchester County Bee-Line	X mark	(Note: No pennies accepted.)	check	X mark

NYC Ferry and NJ Transit fares are paid using physical or digital tickets (in addition to cash on NJ Transit), which are not compatible with the MetroCard, OMNY, or any of the city's other modes of transport.

=== Base fares ===
All fares are in US dollars. Children under 44" tall ride for free with fare-paying rider; limit is 3 except for NYC Ferry and Express Buses.

Service	Fare type	Fare	Special fares
MTA Bus / NYC Bus (Local, Rush, Limited-Stop, Select Bus Service), (Note: The Q70 SBS is free.); NICE Bus, (Note: All Bee-Line and NICE services (including services signed as express) are local services for purposes of the fare except for the BxM4C.) NYC Subway, SIR, (Note: Staten Island Railway fares are collected only at St. George and Tompkinsville stations (in both directions). A second fare is not deducted for travel between St. George and Tompkinsville (except for SingleRide Tickets).) Roosevelt Island Tramway, Hudson Rail Link	Full	$3.00	$3.50 for a SingleRide Ticket
MTA Bus / NYC Bus (Local, Rush, Limited-Stop, Select Bus Service), NICE Bus, NYC Subway, SIR, Roosevelt Island Tramway, Hudson Rail Link	Reduced	$1.50	
Bee-Line Bus (except BxM4C),	Full	$3.00	
Bee-Line Bus (except BxM4C),	Reduced	$1.50	
PATH	Full	$3.25	$3.25 for a PATH SingleRide Ticket
PATH	Reduced	$1.50	$1.50 for PATH by using Senior TAPP
Express buses (MTA / NYC)	Full	$7.25	Children under 2 ride free when sitting on the parent's lap
Express buses (MTA / NYC)	Reduced (off-peak) (Note: Peak travel periods for express buses are 06:00–10:00 a.m. and 3:00–7:00 p.m. weekdays except holidays.)	$3.85	
BxM4C bus	Full	$7.75	
BxM4C bus	Reduced (off-peak)	$3.85	
Student OMNY card (Note: Student OMNY cards are distributed by New York City schools, are valid for one calendar year.: OMNY cards are good for 4 trips a day on MTA local buses, subways, Staten Island Railway, Roosevelt Island Tram, and Hudson Rail Link.; OMNY cards can be used at any time of day throughout the year.)		Free	
NICE Student Fare (Note: The NICE Student Fare requires a NICE student pass, which is issued to students, on request, by their school system. Valid weekdays 6:00 a.m. to 7:00 p.m. during the school year, for travel to and from school only.)		$2.25	
NYC Ferry		$4.50	$1.45 for anyone eligible in the Ferry & Student Discount Programs
AirTrain JFK		$8.75	
Access-A-Ride (NYC paratransit)		$3.00	
Able-Ride (Nassau County paratransit)		$4	$60 for a book of 20 tickets plus one free ticket

=== Unlimited-ride fares ===
The only unlimited option as of January 2026 is the fare cap system. On local transit (subways, buses, the Roosevelt Island Tramway, and the Staten Island Railway), the fare cap is $35 a week ($17.50 for reduced-fare customers). After paying that amount within seven days of an initial tap, customers receive unlimited rides for the rest of that seven-day period. Express buses have a separate fare cap of $67 a week. Local transit fares do not count toward the express bus cap, and vice versa. Airtrain JFK started its farecap system and OMNY discounts (30-Day Fare Cap — $43.50 max and Group Fare — up to 5 riders for $26.75 max) on June 11, 2026.

Between February 28, 2022, and August 20, 2023, Monday-to-Sunday fare capping applied on OMNY. Users of OMNY paid the base fare on buses, subways, and the Staten Island Railway until they had paid a total amount equal to the cost of the 7-Day Unlimited MetroCard option for fares within a single week (from Monday to Sunday), upon which they did not pay fares for subsequent trips. As of March 2022, this meant that full-fare passengers paid $2.75 for each of the first 12 trips made in a week; after they had paid for 12 trips, their fare payment medium became an unlimited-fare on the 13th tap. Reduced-fare customers were also eligible for the unlimited cap by making 12 trips in a week at $1.35 per ride, for a total cost of $16.20. When the base fare was raised to $2.90 on August 21, 2023, the 7-day cap was modified to apply to any consecutive seven-day period. In addition, the fare cap was raised to $34, so riders paid $2.90 for their first 11 trips and $2.10 for their 12th trip.

=== Transfers ===
==== MetroCard and OMNY ====
All transfers with MetroCard or OMNY are free from bus to subway, local bus to local bus, and subway to local bus (only one transfer per fare paid unless otherwise stated below). For transfers from local bus or subway to express buses (except the BxM4C), a step-up charge of $4 is charged. Customers transferring to suburban buses from another system with a lower base fare must pay the difference between the fare on the first bus and the fare on the second bus. With coins, transfers are available to different local buses only, with some restrictions, and issued upon request when boarding only. All transfers are good for two hours and 18 minutes. The transfer system also includes Bee-Line and NICE services as buses, and the Roosevelt Island Tramway as subway (a Tramway-to-local-bus or Tramway-to-subway transfer is allowed). For trips originating on NICE buses, two free transfers were allowed using MetroCard, but only one free transfer is allowed using OMNY.

SingleRide tickets are valid for one ride within two hours after purchase on local buses and the subway. One bus-to-bus transfer is allowed; however, transfer between buses and subways in either direction are not allowed.

On the Select Bus Service routes except S79, customers paying with coins requiring a transfer must board via the front door and request a transfer from the operator. All other customers may board via any of the three doors on Select Bus Service buses.

Bee-Line customers needing to transfer to Connecticut Transit (I-Bus and route 11), Transport of Rockland (Tappan ZEExpress), Putnam Transit (PART 2), or Housatonic Area Regional Transit (Ridgefield-Katonah Shuttle) services must ask for a transfer, even if paying with MetroCard or OMNY. The BxM4C does not accept or issue any transfers.

NICE customers needing to transfer to City of Long Beach N69, Suffolk County Transit, or Huntington Area Rapid Transit services must ask for a transfer, even if paying with MetroCard or OMNY.

There are no free transfers to or from PATH.

==== Designated multiple-transfer corridors ====
Two transfers are available at several places. The transfers must be made within two hours in order or in reverse order, unless otherwise specified.

===== Multimodal =====
1. Between Staten Island bus routes crossing the Staten Island Railway; the Staten Island Railway through St. George Ferry Terminal; and then either the M15, M20, M55 buses or any subway stations below Fulton Street in Lower Manhattan.
2. Between the Bx11 or Bx35, the Bx19, and the subway at Simpson Street.
3. Between the Bx32, the Bx36, and the subway at Burnside Avenue.
4. Between the Bx30, either the Bx28 or Bx38, and the subway at Norwood–205th Street or certain bus routes connecting with the Bx28/Bx38.
5. Between the M104, the M42, and the subway at 42nd Street–Bryant Park/Fifth Avenue or Grand Central–42nd Street.
6. Between any bus route connecting with the M60/M101/M125; any of the M60, M101, or M125; and the subway at 125th Street and either Lexington Avenue, Lenox Avenue, or Frederick Douglass Boulevard.
7. Between the S59 or S78, the S79 SBS, and any connecting bus or subway route in Brooklyn.

When a Uniticket is purchased on the Long Island Rail Road or the Metro-North Railroad, passengers traveling to a valid Uniticket station may transfer to a local bus at that station without paying an additional fare. The reverse is true for Uniticket holders boarding a bus toward a valid Uniticket station.

===== Bus =====
1. Between the B11 and B6, and any connecting bus route on either line.
2. Between the B61 and B62, and certain connecting bus routes on either line.
3. Between the westbound Bx4A, the westbound Bx4, and certain bus routes connecting with the Bx4.
4. Between the Bx11, certain bus routes connecting with the Bx11/Bx40/Bx42, and the Bx40 and Bx42.
5. Between the Bx18A/B, the eastbound Bx11, and certain bus routes connecting with the Bx11.
6. Between the Bx18A/B, the eastbound Bx35, and certain bus routes connecting with the Bx35.
7. Between the Bx23, the Q50, and certain connecting bus routes on either line.
8. Between the Bx29; any of the Bx5, Bx12, Bx23 or Q50; and certain bus routes connecting with these routes.
9. Between the Bx29, the Bx12, and certain bus routes connecting with the Bx12.
10. Between the Bx35, certain bus routes connecting with the Bx35/Bx11, and the Bx11.
11. Between the Bx36, certain bus routes connecting with the Bx36/Bx40/Bx42, and the Bx40 and Bx42.
12. Between the M20 and M10, and certain connecting bus routes on either line.
13. Between the M55 and M5, and certain connecting bus routes on either line.
14. Between the M100, either the M101 or M125, and certain bus routes connecting with the M101 or M125.
15. Between the M104 and M42, and certain connecting bus routes on either line.
16. Between the M125, the Bx15, and certain connecting bus routes on either line.
17. In Queens, multi-transfer corridors using OMNY and MetroCard are limited to the following:
  1. Between the n20G, the n20H, n20X or n21, and then any connecting bus route.
  2. Between the Q4, Q5, Q42, Q84, Q85, Q86, Q87 and Q89 at Jamaica Center; the Q17, Q30, Q31 and Q75 in downtown Jamaica; and the Q2, Q36, Q43 and Q82 at 168th Street Bus Terminal. Additionally, the second transfer in both directions can be to a Q83 bus.
  3. Between the southbound Q27, the westbound Q83, and the subway (or vice versa). A second transfer is also available between certain connecting bus routes on the Q27, the southbound Q27, and the westbound Q83 (or vice versa).

A six-month pilot program starting in June 2025 for OMNY only (which ended in November): On any trip that began on a Queens bus route, a second free transfer was provided to riders who used the same card or device on all three legs. The third transfer had to take place within three hours of the first tap. Additional transfer corridors are listed in the NYCT Tariff.

===== Subway =====
Pay-Per-Ride MetroCard and OMNY customers cannot make subway-to-subway transfers by exiting the turnstile and entering again, with two exceptions:

- Upper East Side, Manhattan – Lexington Avenue/59th Street on the IRT Lexington Avenue and BMT Broadway Lines (4, 5, 6, <6>, N, R, and W trains) and Lexington Avenue/63rd Street on the 63rd Street lines (M and Q trains).
- Brownsville, Brooklyn – Livonia Avenue (L train) and Junius Street (34 train).

Until 2011, an extra out-of-system subway-to-subway transfer was allowed in Long Island City, Queens, between 23rd Street–Ely Avenue/Long Island City–Court Square on the IND Queens Boulevard and Crosstown Lines and 45th Road–Court House Square on the IRT Flushing Line. This transfer was eliminated with the opening of an in-system transfer passageway among the three stations. Additional out-of-system transfers are added on a case-by-case basis, usually whenever a regular transfer is unavailable due to construction. Past instances included two transfers in Williamsburg and Bedford–Stuyvesant, Brooklyn, due to the 14th Street Tunnel shutdown from 2019 to 2020; a transfer in Gravesend, Brooklyn, due to the BMT Sea Beach Line (N train)'s partial suspension from 2019 to 2020; and two transfers in Inwood, Manhattan, in 2019 due to the closure of the 168th Street station (1 train).

==== Transfer restrictions ====
There are restrictions on transfers, as noted below. The transfer rules and restrictions are identical for MetroCard and OMNY, where OMNY is available.

===== Bus =====
For Pay-Per-Ride MetroCard and OMNY customers, there is no free transfer back onto the same route on which the fare was initially paid, or between the following buses:

- No transfer in the opposite direction (but transfers are permitted to buses in the same direction):
  - M1, M2, M3, M4
  - M101, M102, M103
  - Bx1 and Bx2
- No transfer in either direction:
  - M96 and M106
  - Bx40 and Bx42
- No transfers between NICE bus routes that are not listed on the timetable of the route on which fare is paid. Essentially, one cannot transfer between bus routes that do not intersect.
- Express:
  - No transfers to/from BxM4C, even with a Pay-Per-Ride MetroCard.
  - No transfers between different Union Turnpike express buses (QM1, QM5, QM6, QM31, QM35, QM36) traveling in the opposite direction.

===== Between subway and bus =====
There are no subway-to-bus or bus-to-subway transfers allowed without a MetroCard or OMNY.

Prior to May 16, 2025, there was one exception:

- At the Rockaway Parkway Intermodal Center on the BMT Canarsie Line (L train), westbound B6, B82 Local, and B82 Select Bus Service customers arriving from East New York and Canarsie, eastbound B6 Local customers on trips terminating at Rockaway Parkway, and all B42 customers, were transported directly into the subway system's fare control without having to pass through turnstiles (as the former trolley line had a loop installed within fare control). Similarly, subway passengers could transfer to B42 and westbound B6 and B82 Local service without using a MetroCard or OMNY (westbound B82 SBS customers must still obtain proof of payment, but have a second transfer to another route). The subway platform was enclosed with fencing and turnstiles to prevent fare evasion.

==== NYC Ferry ====
As NYC Ferry uses a separate fare payment system from the rest of New York City's transportation system, it does not provide any free transfers to any other modes of transportation using MetroCard or OMNY. However, passengers can request one free transfer to a connecting NYC Ferry route, valid within 90 minutes of the passenger boarding the first route. Tickets are checked prior to boarding, when the boat arrives at the station.

=== OMNY-specific features ===
The technology for making a transfer on MTA buses and subways differs slightly between MetroCards and OMNY devices. To allow for operation on vehicles disconnected from the MTA communications network, MetroCards store information about the transfer on the card itself. Third-party digital wallets, debit cards, credit cards generally cannot store transit-specific information on the consumer card or device. OMNY solves this problem by only charging riders once a day, after vehicles have had a chance to return to base and download boarding data. Though the second entry may display to the rider that the full fare is being charged, as long as the same device was used within the two-hour window, it is discounted when calculating the amount to actually be paid.

The OMNY system also measures the usage of OMNY cards. In October 2021, the MTA considered enabling a fare cap on OMNY cards and devices, similar to the fare caps on Oyster cards. Under the proposal, an OMNY card or device would be charged a pay-per-ride fare on MTA buses and subways if a passenger has made fewer than a specified number of trips in a certain time period. After the passenger makes more than that quantity of trips, they would be charged the unlimited rate. For example, with a pay-per-ride fare of $2.75 and a weekly unlimited MetroCard cost of $33 (as of October 2021), a passenger would still pay $2.75 per trip if they made 12 or fewer trips in a week; under the proposal, they would pay no more than $33 within a week, even if they made 13 or more trips. OMNY fare caps were implemented on February 28, 2022. If multiple riders use the same OMNY card when paying fares, only one tap during every 15-minute period counts toward the fare cap. OMNY does not have a monthly fare cap.

Since June 1, 2022, riders who qualified for reduced-fare MetroCards could also use OMNY with their contactless bank cards or smart devices, paying half the standard fare. At the time, reduced-fare OMNY cards were unavailable. Each qualifying rider can only use one contactless card or device for reduced-fare OMNY. If a reduced-fare rider has more than one card or device, the other cards and devices will either be charged a full fare or be restricted from tapping-in at an OMNY reader.

== Issues ==
=== Privacy issues ===
Privacy advocacy group Surveillance Technology Oversight Project (STOP) criticized the MTA and Cubic in an October 2019 report on the privacy of the OMNY system, arguing that it "allows the MTA, and potentially third parties, to collect an alarming amount of information about transit users." STOP expressed concerns that the OMNY privacy policy was unclear, and warned that the MTA could share data with the New York City Police Department and United States Immigration and Customs Enforcement to extend the reach of police surveillance.

The MTA modified the OMNY website in August 2023 to remove a feature that showed users' trip history, following a 404 Media investigation that showed it had a potential for abuse. From its launch in 2019, the OMNY website included a feature that allowed customers to view all uses of a credit or debit card at OMNY readers for the last 7 days by providing the card number and expiration. 404 Media argued that this feature easily allowed abusers or identity thieves to view a victim's travel history, as credit card numbers can be obtained relatively easily. Following the discontinuation of the trip history feature, customers who create an account can still view trip history, and accounts are not verified. STOP founder Albert Fox Cahn criticized the changes to the trip history feature as a half-measure, arguing that it still left user information vulnerable.

=== Technical issues ===
In February 2020, the MTA warned that some customers using Apple Pay's Express Transit feature might be accidentally double-charged if they were using a MetroCard. This occurred when riders unintentionally had their phones in proximity to the OMNY readers. At that point, the issue was relatively rare, having been reported 30 times. Complaints also arose over the fact that riders who paid via credit card, debit card, or smart device did not get billed until several days after they had completed their trip. In June 2025, Visa Inc. fixed a technical issue that caused the OMNY readers to attempt to charge some Visa credit-card holders multiple times for a single trip. Other glitches included reports of turnstiles not accepting valid OMNY cards, as well as free transfers not being provided even when riders used the same card or device for both legs of their trip. These issues persisted in 2026, when riders reported that fare caps and free transfers were not provided on their fare media.

The news website The City wrote in 2025 that riders had been prevented from using cards that were eligible for a pre-tax federal transit benefit, and it was often an arduous process to contact customer service representatives once problems arose. Students similarly reported that there were delays in replacing OMNY cards that were nonfunctional or had been lost, and that the student cards were easy to damage because they were made of paper.

A July 2025 survey of 400 riders found that three-fourths had reported issues with their OMNY fare media. The most common complaints were that OMNY readers did not accept valid fare media (OMNY cards/SingleRide tickets; credit/debit cards; smart devices; etc.), fare payments did not show up on riders' bank statements in a timely manner, and the fare media had been overcharged. In addition, OMNY readers did not show the remaining balance on cards after riders had paid their fares. In response, in 2025, the MTA proposed displaying remaining balances on OMNY readers.

== See also ==
- New York City transit fares
- TAPP (fare collection system)
