= Frank Hedley =

English-American businessman (1864–1955)

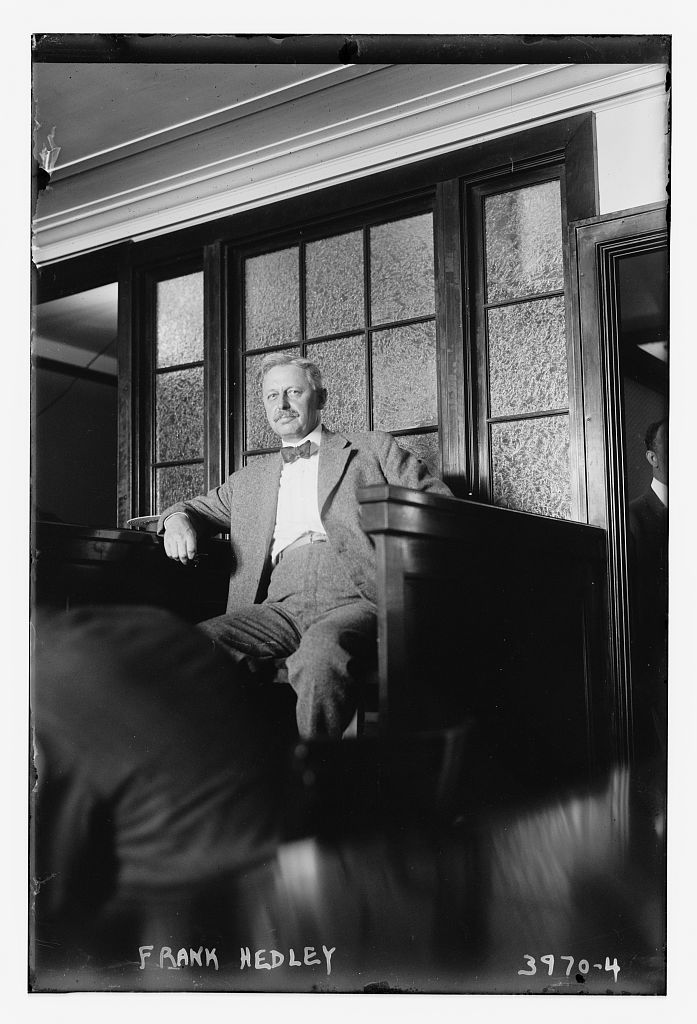
Hedley in 1916

Frank Hedley (January 9, 1864 – July 18, 1955) was an English-American transportation executive who was president and general manager of the Interborough Rapid Transit Company.

== Biography ==
He was born in 1864 in Maidstone, England. He migrated in 1883 to the United States and began working as a steam locomotive machinist for, first, the New York Lake Erie & Western RR in Jersey City, then New York Central & Hudson River at the locomotive servicing area at Grand Central Depot. Seeking career advancement, he soon got a job with New York Elevated Railroad in Manhattan. In 1890, Hedley was hired as master mechanic (steam) by the Kings County Elevated in Brooklyn. In 1893, he left New York seeking employment on elevated lines in Chicago. By 1900, Hedley was general superintendent of the Lake Street Elevated Railroad in Chicago. In 1903, Hedley returned to New York City to take the position of general superintendent of the Interborough Rapid Transit (IRT). Hedley would spend the rest of his career at IRT, rising to company president by 1920.

He died on July 17, 1955, at Saint John's Riverside Hospital in Yonkers, NY.
