= M116 (New York City bus) =

Bus route in Manhattan, New York

m116
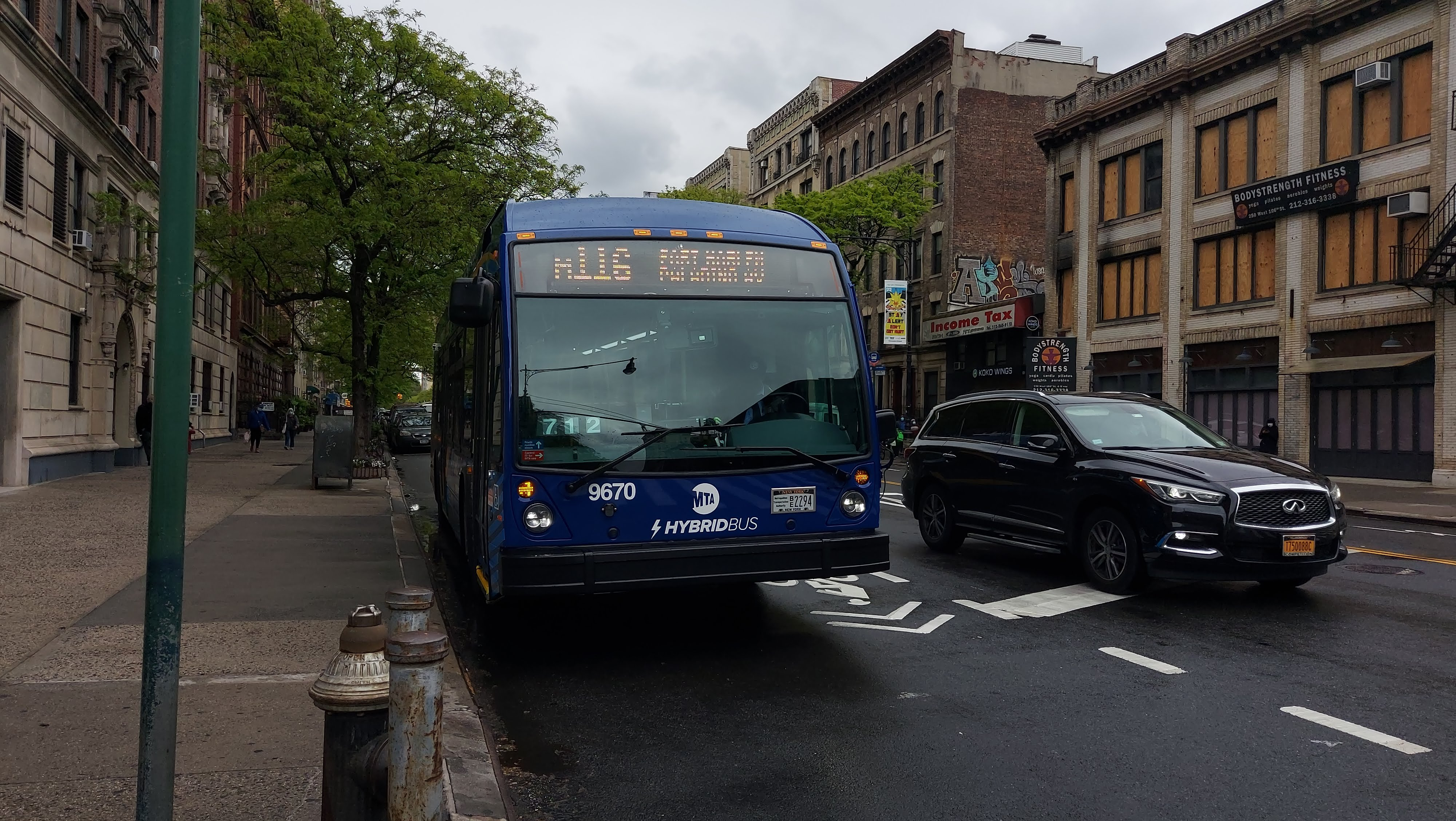
- A 2021 Nova Bus LFS HEV (9670) on the East Harlem-bound M116

Overview
- System: MTA Regional Bus Operations
- Operator: Manhattan and Bronx Surface Transit Operating Authority
- Garage: Manhattanville Depot
- Vehicle: Nova Bus LFS HEV; New Flyer Xcelsior XDE40; Orion VII NG HEV
- Began service: April 1, 1936

Route
- Locale: Manhattan, New York, U.S.
- Communities served: Upper West Side, Harlem, East Harlem
- Start: Upper West Side - 106th Street & Broadway
- Via: 116th Street
- End: East Harlem – 120th Street & Pleasant Avenue
- Length: 2.9 miles (4.7 km)

Service
- Operates: All times except late nights
- Annual patronage: 1,609,245 (2025)
- Transfers: Yes
- Timetable: M116

The 116th Street Line is a public transit line in Manhattan, running mostly along 116th Street. Originally a streetcar line, it is now the M116 bus route operated by MaBSTOA, running between the Upper West Side and East Harlem.

== Route description ==
The M116 begins at West 106th Street and Broadway, running west on 106th Street until Manhattan Avenue, before running north on Manhattan Avenue and turning to run east on 116th Street until 1st Avenue, where eastbound buses run north and then loop around the Robert F. Wagner Houses to terminate at Pleasant Avenue. Westbound buses run south on Pleasant Avenue to 116th Street to return to the route.

== History ==
The New York City Omnibus Corporation bus started the route (M20-20) on April 1, 1936, to replace the New York Railways' 116th Street Crosstown Line streetcar. It has largely remained the same, with the exception of in 1993, when it, along with some other Manhattan crosstown routes, had their designations changed, with the M20 becoming the M116.

Until the 126th Street Depot closed in 2015, the M116 ran with articulated buses during rush hours.

As part of a pilot program by the MTA to make five bus routes free (one in each borough), the M116 was selected alongside the B60, Bx18, Q4 and S46/96 to become fare-free in July 2023. The pilot program would last six to twelve months and buses would display a "Fare Free" sign, similar to the one used on the Q70. The pilot will run from September 24, 2023 until at least March 30, 2024. Though ten U.S. Congress members requested in April 2024 that the state government provide additional funding for the fare-free pilot program, state lawmakers declined to reauthorize funding for the program. The fare-free program ended on August 31, 2024.
