= Bx18 bus =

Bus route in New York City

bx18A, bx18B
- 170th Street Circulator Loop Line

Overview
- System: MTA Regional Bus Operations
- Operator: Manhattan and Bronx Surface Transit Operating Authority
- Garage: Kingsbridge Depot
- Vehicle: Nova Bus LFS; Nova Bus LFS HEV; Nova Bus LFSe+
- Began service: June 22, 1941

Route
- Locale: The Bronx, New York, U.S.
- Communities served: Morrisania, Morris Heights, Highbridge
- Start: Morrisania – East 170th Street & Grand Concourse (clockwise)
- Via: Macombs Road, Undercliff Avenue, West 168th Street (Bx18A only), Sedgwick Avenue, Macombs Road (Bx18B only)
- End: Morrisania – East 170th Street & Grand Concourse (counterclockwise)

Service
- Operates: All times except late nights
- Annual patronage: 493,909 (2025)
- Transfers: Yes
- Timetable: Bx18 bus

The Bx18A and Bx18B (collectively referred to as Bx18A/B or Bx18) bus routes constitute the 170th Street Circulator Loop Line. These bus routes run through a loop after 170th Street. The Bx18A goes through Undercliff Avenue while the Bx18B follows Sedgwick Avenue until turning back to 170th Street.

== Route description ==
The Bx18A and Bx18B loop route begins at 170th Street and Grand Concourse near the 170th Street station. Then it continues on through the street line until at the 170th Street-Jerome Avenue station. Turning around against to loops. The Bx18A goes through Macombs Road then turns slightly left to Undercliff Avenue. The Bx18B does the same thing at Macombs but it only turns slightly left to Sedgwick Avenue. Those two bus routes finally meet again via 168th Street. And lastly, their destination is at 170th Street and Grand Concourse near the 170th Street station as of an clockwise.

== History ==
The Bx18 started as a single route on June 22, 1941. The original eastern terminus was at Claremont Parkway-Webster Avenue.

Service was cut back to its current terminus in July 1974. The original western terminus was at Andrews Avenue-West 175th Street. It was extended west via the former Bx39 service (which was discontinued in 1953) to the River Park Towers in July 1974.

On June 26, 2022, the route was extended south from River Park Towers to 168th Street and east on 168th Street, Shakespeare Avenue, and 170th Street to the Grand Concourse, making it a loop route. On January 8, 2023, the Bx18 was split into the Bx18A and Bx18B to label each loop.

As part of a pilot program by the MTA to make five bus routes free (one in each borough), the Bx18 was selected alongside the B60, M116, Q4 and S46/96 to become fare-free in July 2023. The pilot program would last six to twelve months and buses would display a "Fare Free" sign, similar to the one used on the Q70. The pilot will run from September 24, 2023, until at least March 30, 2024. Though ten U.S. Congress members requested in April 2024 that the state government provide additional funding for the fare-free pilot program, state lawmakers declined to reauthorize funding for the program. The fare-free program ended on August 31, 2024.

== Connecting bus routes ==
- Bx1, Bx2, BxM4 (at Grand Concourse)
- Bx3, Bx36 (at University Avenue)
- Bx40, Bx42 (at Sedgwick Avenue)
- Bx13 (at Ogden Avenue)
- Bx35 (at Edward L Grant Highway)
