= Thomas McKean (disambiguation) =

Thomas McKean was an American lawyer and politician.

Thomas McKean may also refer to:

- Thomas J. McKean (1810–1870), American engineer, soldier and politician
- Thomas A. McKean (born 1965), American autistic author and lecturer
- Tom McKean (born 1963), British runner
- Thomas McKean (artist), American New York City based artist
- SS Thomas McKean, a Liberty ship
