= SmartLink (smart card) =

Public transit payment system in the New York City area

- Location: New York City metropolitan area
- Launched: July 2, 2007
- Discontinued: August 31, 2026
- Technology: Contactless smart card by Cubic Transportation Systems, Inc.
- Manager: Port Authority of New York and New Jersey
- Currency: USD ($364 (140 trips @ $2.60) maximum load)
- Stored-value: 1, 10, 20, 40 trips, 1, 7, 30 day unlimited rides
- Credit expiry: none
- Auto recharge: refill
- Unlimited use: refill
- Validity: PATH
- Retailed: Stations; Online; Telephone
- Variants: Senior SmartLink; SmartLink Gray (non-refillable)
- Website: http://pathsmartlink.info/

SmartLink is a discontinued RFID-enabled credit card-sized smartcard that was the primary fare payment method on the PATH transit system in Newark and Hudson County in New Jersey and Manhattan in New York City. It was designed to replace PATH's paper-based farecard, QuickCard, and there were plans to expand its usage throughout most transit agencies in the tri-state area. The SmartLink card had been available to the public since July 2, 2007. Although the MetroCard used on the Metropolitan Transportation Authority (MTA)'s transit system could also be used on the PATH, the reverse was not true for SmartLink, which couldn't be used on the MTA's system. SmartLink was replaced by a contactless payment system called TAPP beginning in 2023. Sales of many SmartLink products were discontinued on May 4, 2026. The SmartLink system was discontinued on August 31, 2026.

== Registration ==
All SmartLink cards were eligible for online registration. In order to register a card, one had to go to PATH's registration page and complete a form detailing the card holder's name, the unique serial code of the SmartLink card, and address. An account holder's information was able to be accessed online or by calling the SmartLink hotline. Money from lost cards could be transferred to a replacement card if the customer has an account; however, all replacement cards carry a $5 fee.

Registration of the card also permits the holder to monitor its usage and link the SmartLink card to a credit card in the automatic replenishment program. When the card balance drops to five trips (or five days, for riders with an unlimited pass), the SmartLink card is topped up using the credit card on the account. This program can be managed online, on the PATH website.

== Sales ==
Pre-loaded SmartLink cards with 10 trips were available at all stations for $31.00 (10 trips at $2.60 each, plus a $5.00 card fee). However, MetroCard Vending Machines (MVMs) at all PATH stations were able to refill the SmartLink cards to a monetary amount equal to 1, 2, 4, 10, 20 and 40 trips as well as the daily or 30 day unlimited passes.

$5.00 SmartLink Cards with no trips, ready for charging at any PATH MetroCard Vending Machine, were available from vending machines at 33rd Street, Hoboken, Journal Square, Exchange Place, Newport and World Trade Center.

SmartLink card were able to be purchased via the SmartLinkSM Card Dispensers (33rd Street, Hoboken, Journal Square, Newark, World Trade Center). Zero trip and 20 trip cards ($57.00 (20 trips at $2.60 each, plus a $5.00 card fee) were also available for purchase online on the PATH website. At one time Pre-loaded SmartLink Cards were available at newsstands in PATH terminals but PATH has discontinued this.

== Fares ==
When buying a SmartLink card for the first time, an additional, one-time $5 fee is levied to offset the cost of producing the card. The cards can be refilled in specified numbers of trips or by adding unlimited passes. When refilling, the regular fare structure is used and the $5 card purchase fee is not imposed. As of 2026, the following fare structure is in effect:

Trips	Fare	Cost per trip
1-trip	$3.00	$3.00
10-trip	$28.50	$2.85
20-trip	$57.00	$2.85
40-trip	$114.00	$2.85
Senior SmartLink†	$1.50	$1.50
SmartLink 1-day pass	$11.50	N/A
SmartLink 7-day pass	$39.25	N/A
SmartLink 30-day pass	$120.75	N/A

The maximum number of trips that can be loaded on the card is 140. An unlimited pass can be loaded on top of a regular trip SmartLink card. When that occurs, the individual rides will remain in the background of the card. When the unlimited pass expires the individual trips will be available for use.

†Discounted fares are offered to seniors 65 years or older. The disabled, military, and students are not included in PATH's reduced-fare program.

== Implementation ==
The initial testing phase was delayed several times due to software problems. It was originally intended to start in August 2006, but was postponed to October 2006. Continuing problems moved the testing phase of Senior SmartCards to February 2007.

On July 2, 2007, the Port Authority of New York and New Jersey (PANYNJ) commenced the initial roll-out of the SmartLink card to the general public at the World Trade Center station. On July 23, 2007 the card was introduced at the 33rd Street station. On August 6, 2007 the card was introduced at the Hoboken station.

During the initial roll out, the cost of the card was $29 which included the 20 ride fare of $24 plus a $5 charge for the card. In February 2008 the cards were formally rolled out to the general public at all stations. In the initial stage, the SmartLink card allowed riders to place the same value on it as if they were purchasing a QuickCard by using machines located in PATH stations.

== Expansion ==
The Port Authority, part of several transit systems in the New York-New Jersey region, is hoping that one day there will be a universal fare card for the region's transportation. However, estimates for expanding the SmartLink card to the New York City Subway and MTA buses may cost as high as $300 million. Estimates for adding New Jersey Transit would cost an additional $100 million. However, the adoption of OMNY on New York City Transit will mean that SmartLink will not be expanded to other transit systems.

== Discontinuation ==
In June 2019, the Port Authority announced it was in talks with the MTA to implement OMNY on the PATH by 2022. Under the presented plan, SmartLink would be phased out along with the MetroCard by 2023. In November 2021, the Port Authority indicated that it would instead implement its own fare payment system, which would be similar to OMNY. TAPP, or Total Access PATH Payment, will accept debit and credit cards and phones for fare payment, the Port Authority indicated it would not accept OMNY at the new turnstiles. The same month, officials awarded a $99.4 million contract to Cubic Transportation Systems for the installation of the new fare-payment system, which would replace SmartLink by 2024. The new fare payment system would be tested in a few stations in early 2023 before being installed across the network in the latter half of the year. SmartLink cards would not be accepted on the new fare payment system. TAPP was implemented at all stations by 2024, and TAPP machines and physical TAPP cards were introduced in 2025.

On May 4, 2026, sales of single-ride SmartLinks were discontinued and replaced with paper tickets, while multi-trip passes and unlimited passes were sold at TAPP vending machines instead. On May 31, refills and sales of new SmartLink cards were also discontinued, with exceptions for reduced fare passengers. The SmartLink system was discontinued on August 31, 2026.

== SmartLink Gray ==
On October 24, 2008, the Port Authority announced that as of November 30, 2008, NJ Transit ticket machines in NJ Transit stations would no longer sell the QuickCard, and as of December 31, 2008, NJ Transit ticket machines in PATH stations (Newark, Hoboken, Journal Square, Exchange Place, and Pavonia-Newport) would no longer sell the cards. The machines at the 33rd Street, Grove Street and WTC stations were removed in 2008.

At the end of 2010, the QuickCard was discontinued, and replaced with the SmartLink Gray card, a non-refillable, disposable version of the SmartLink card. This card was sold at selected newsstand vendors, and available in 10, 20 and 40 trips (at the discounted price of $2.10 per trip). Unlike the regular SmartLink cards, the SmartLink Gray cards had an expiration date.

In 2016, PATH announced that it would discontinue the sale of SmartLink Gray cards on January 31, in favor of passengers using the refillable, plastic SmartLink card. A short term exchange program was offered until February 2016, to allow passengers to swap their paper card for the plastic card without having to pay the $5.00 fee for the plastic card.

== See also ==
- CharlieCard
- Chicago Card
- Clipper card
- Octopus card
- Opus card
- Oyster card
- SmarTrip
