= Chicago Card =

Former smart card of the Chicago Transit Authority

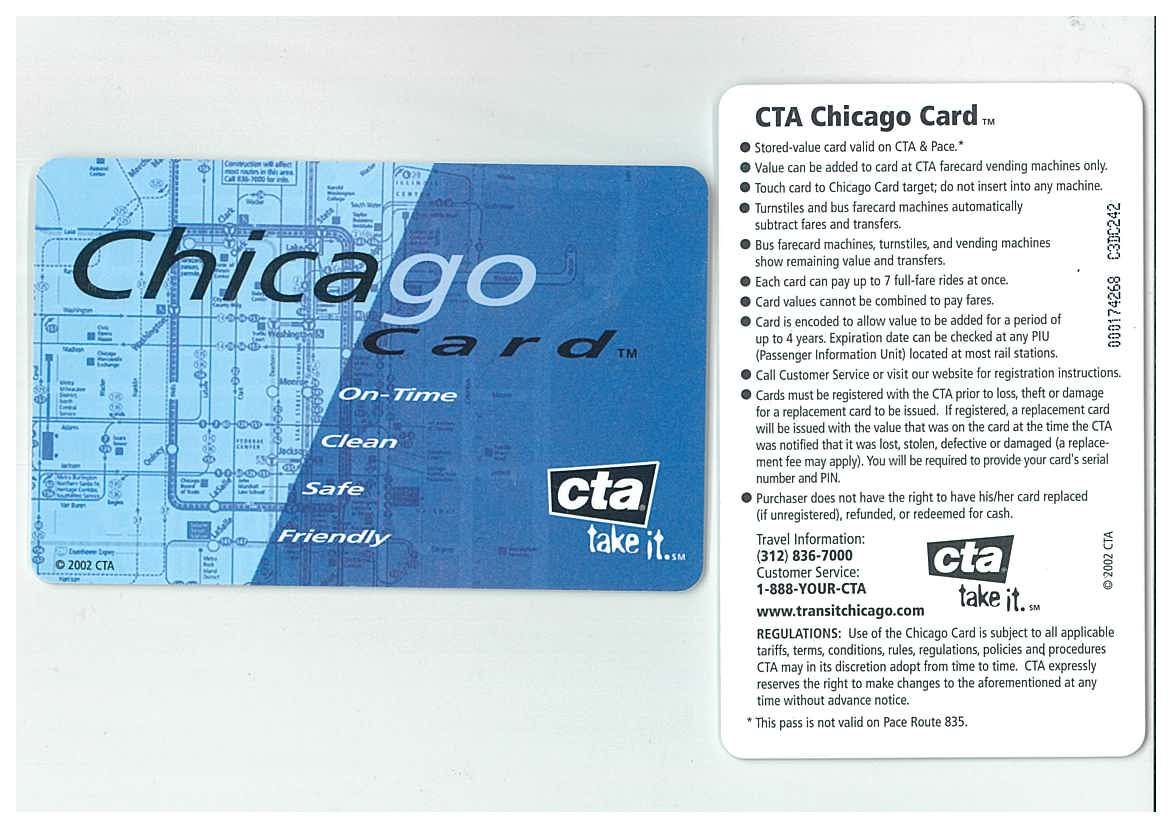
- Front and back of the Chicago Card
- Location: Chicago
- Launched: 1997
- Discontinued: 2014
- Successor: Ventra
- Technology: Smart card
- Manager: RFID
- Currency: USD
- Stored-value: Pay-Per-Ride
- Validity: Chicago Transit Authority; Pace Suburban Bus
- Variants: Chicago Card Plus
- Website: www.chicago-card.com

The Chicago Card and the Chicago Card Plus were contactless smart cards used by riders of the Chicago Transit Authority (CTA) and Pace to electronically pay for bus and train fares in the city of Chicago, Illinois, US, and the surrounding suburbs. On June 1, 2014, CTA and Pace stopped accepting these cards as part of a transition to Ventra.

The blue Chicago Card was a stored value card. Users added value to the card at CTA vending machines or at select retail locations, and turnstiles or fareboxes deducted value from the card. Users usually registered cards with CTA and could receive a replacement in the event of theft, loss, or damage to the card.

The blue-and-gold Chicago Card Plus was an account-based card. Users linked the card to either a credit card, debit card, or employer-provided transit benefit program. The cards could be set up as monthly passes or on a pay-per-use basis. The account reloaded from the linked source either when the monthly pass expired or when a user-defined threshold was passed on a pay-per-use card. Because of this direct link to personal accounts, all Chicago Card Plus cards were registered by their users.

== History ==
CTA's Automated Fare Collection (AFC) system was installed in 1997 by Cubic Transportation Systems, Inc., the largest provider of AFC systems in the USA. The AFC system replaced the CTA's tokens with magnetic-stripe stored-value cards printed on plastic or paper based on Cubic's earlier MetroCard implementation in New York City. All fare collection and payment equipment was designed to be retrofitted at a later date with smart card readers, a technology that was on the horizon. A small pilot program ("Chicago Gold") for reduced-fare disabled riders in 1999 led to a contract with Cubic to install smart card readers universally in 2000. In August 2000, a more extensive "Chicago Card" pilot program distributed stored-value smart cards to volunteer participants. The pilot program was expanded system-wide in November 2002. The Chicago Card Plus debuted in January 2004. "Go Lane" card readers were installed in the buses, starting in 2005, allowing Chicago Card users to bypass the line of passengers using the farebox; however, only one payment could be accepted at a time, eliminating this possible efficiency. The Go Lane card readers were removed starting in May 2010 and Chicago Card card readers were moved back to the main fare box.

In February 2007, CTA announced that it had settled a class action lawsuit alleging there were not enough Chicago Cards available to meet demand on January 1, 2006, when the cash fare increase went into effect, but Chicago Card users were charged the old fares.

== Benefits ==
Benefits of the Chicago Card and the Chicago Card Plus included the following:

- Because it was a contactless card, the card never needed to be removed from its holder, be it a wallet, purse, or backpack. (It may have needed to be removed if there was another smartcard nearby)
- The Chicago Card could be reloaded at any L stop and many currency exchanges and supermarkets.
- If registered, the card could be replaced.
- The Chicago Card Plus was an account-based system that allowed customers to manage their account using the internet and a credit card for added convenience.
- Until July 1, 2013, Chicago Card and Chicago Card Plus users paid only $2.25 at the O'Hare Blue Line station instead of the new $5 fare.

== Disadvantages ==
- A 30-day pass was only possible with the Chicago Card Plus.
- Unlike many other transit "monthly passes" the Chicago Card Plus only offered a "30 day pass," meaning the pass was active for 30 days regardless of when the account is activated. This card had to be loaded twice in some months because of this feature.
- In order to obtain a 30-day pass, users needed to link a credit or debit card account. Reloading at CTA/retail locations was not possible.
- In order to postpone a 30-day pass (even for one day) the entire card had to be deactivated and could not be reactivated. (A new card had to be activated.)
- The regular (blue-only) Chicago Card was only able to be loaded at specified CTA/retail locations.
- Users were unable to transfer funds between Chicago Card and Chicago Card Plus.
- The two cards had very little in common, making it difficult to choose which card to purchase. Some users found themselves possessing both cards depending on their commuting needs and financial situations. This caused riders to spend more money than necessary in order to maintain the two cards.
- Because the cards were registered to discrete individuals, the CTA could track user movement through the system.
- All cards expired four years from date of manufacture and had to be replaced when they expired. Though the replacement was free there was no expiry date printed on the card and recovering a balance could occasionally be difficult.
- The card sometimes had to be taken out of the user's wallet if there was another smartcard close by.

== Student Pass ==
In addition to the blue card, CTA also offered transit cards to students in both grammar schools and high schools. The passes included the phrase "STUDENT RIDING PERMIT", the year that the card was active, and the card's expiration date. The cards appeared in a variety of colors including pink, blue, and yellow. Student Passes could be bought at many schools and allowed students to pay $0.75 instead of the standard $2.25 fare. Disadvantages included the possibility that presentation of the passenger's student ID might be required in order for the pass to be honored and that the card was only valid on school days when school was in session (Monday through Friday, from 5:30 A.M. to 8:30 P.M., excluding holidays such as Thanksgiving Day, Labor Day, Memorial Day, and the two-week winter break period including Christmas Day and New Years).

== Phase-Out ==
The CTA announced it would replace the Chicago Card and other fare media with a new electronic fare payment system named Ventra. There are also reports that the Regional Transportation Authority is planning to require that Pace and Metra adopt that system. The transition to Ventra was completed in the summer of 2014.

== See also ==
- Atlanta (the Breeze Card)
- Boston (CharlieCard)
- Chicago (Ventra)
- Greater Toronto Area & Ottawa (Presto card)
- Hong Kong (the Octopus card)
- List of public transport smart cards
- London (the Oyster card)
- Los Angeles (TAP card)
- Montreal (Opus card)
- New York City (MetroCard)
- Paris (Navigo card)
- Philadelphia (SEPTA Key)
- San Francisco Bay Area (Clipper card)
- Seattle (ORCA card)
- Seoul (T-money)
- Shanghai, Taipei (EasyCard)
- Singapore
- Tokyo (Suica)
- Washington, D.C. (SmarTrip)
