= Valley Regional Transit =

Bus operator serving Boise, Idaho, U.S.

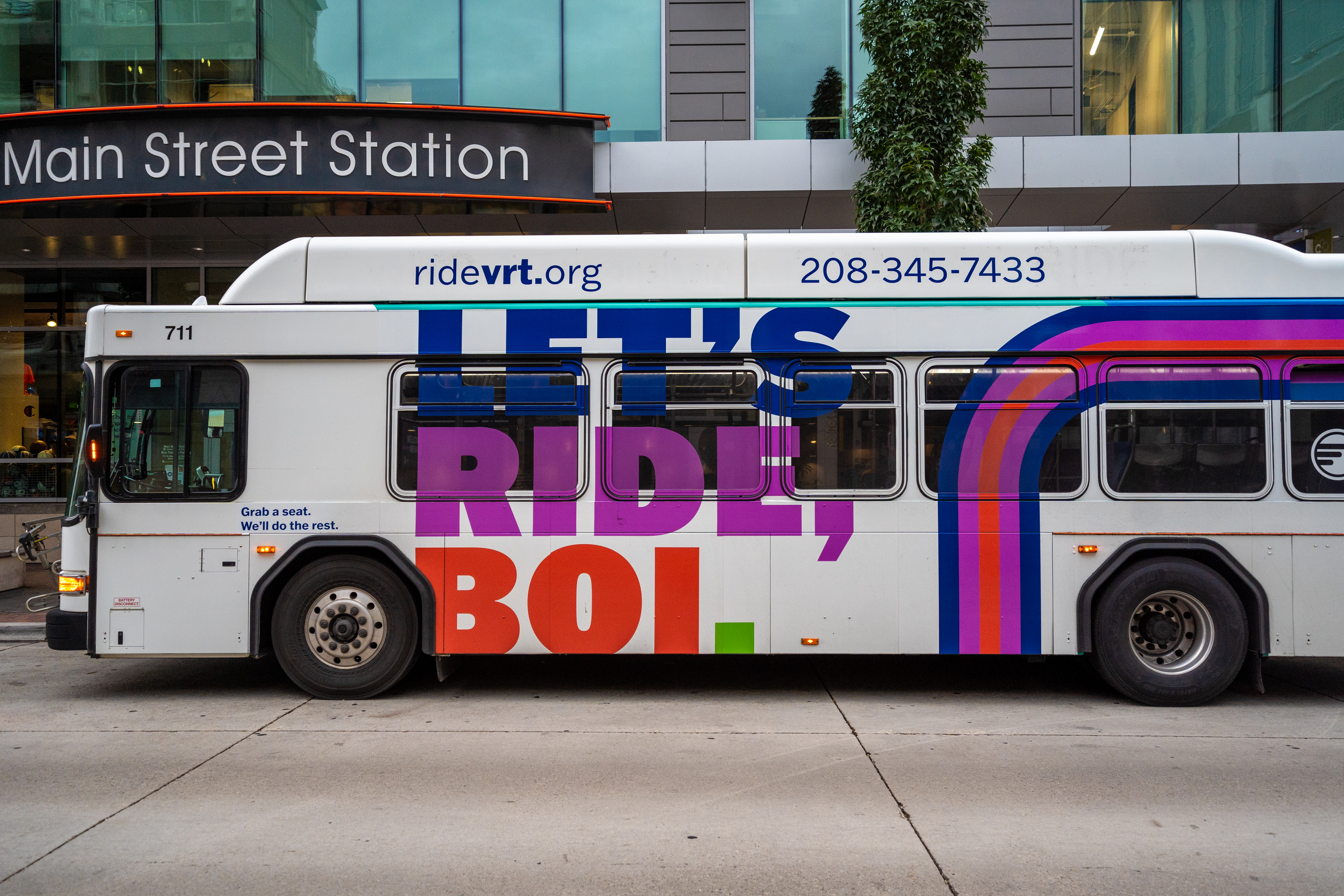
- A VRT bus in front of the pedestrian entrance to Main Street Station.
- Founded: 1999
- Headquarters: 700 NE 2nd St. #100
- Locale: Meridian, Idaho
- Service area: Ada County, Idaho; Canyon County, Idaho
- Service type: bus service
- Routes: 21
- Stations: Main Street Station, Happy Day Transit Center
- Fleet: 45 buses (2023)
- Annual ridership: 1,084,743 (2024)
- Fuel type: CNG & Diesel
- Operator: First Transit
- Chief executive: Elaine Clegg
- Website: Valley Regional Transit

Valley Regional Transit (VRT) is a public transit service in metropolitan Boise, Idaho. It operates 19 fixed-route services, mostly in Ada County, as well as one on-demand service in Canyon County. Buses run from Monday to Saturday on most routes.

== History ==
In 1994, the Idaho Legislature passed a law that allows cities or counties to place the creation of regional public transportation authorities on the ballot to request voter approval. In November 1998, voters in Ada and Canyon Counties approved creating an RPTA for their respective counties. A few months later, in January 1999, The boards of directors of the Ada County and Canyon County RPTAs voted to merge the two organizations, creating the Treasure Valley Regional Transportation Authority. The organization went through a few more name changes, becoming VIATrans, short for Valley InterArea Transportation, and then ValleyRide in June 2002. In July of that year, ValleyRide took over operations of Boise Urban Stages, which had been the operator of bus service in the city of Boise since 1973. By 2003, ValleyRide also operated service in Garden City previously offered by Garden City Interline, and had agreements with Treasure Valley Transit and Commuters Bus for the operation of the intercounty routes. In November 2004, the organization was renamed to Valley Regional Transit, with the ValleyRide name being used to describe the services offered. On March 1, 2005, the agreements with Treasure Valley Transit and Commuters Bus for the intercounty routes expired, and VRT began using First Transit to provide service on intercounty routes as well as routes within Canyon County.

On April 15, 2015, VRT launched Boise Greenbike, the city's bicycle-sharing system. At the end of September 2020, VRT suspended the program, with plans to restart it in the spring of 2021 using electric-assist bikes.

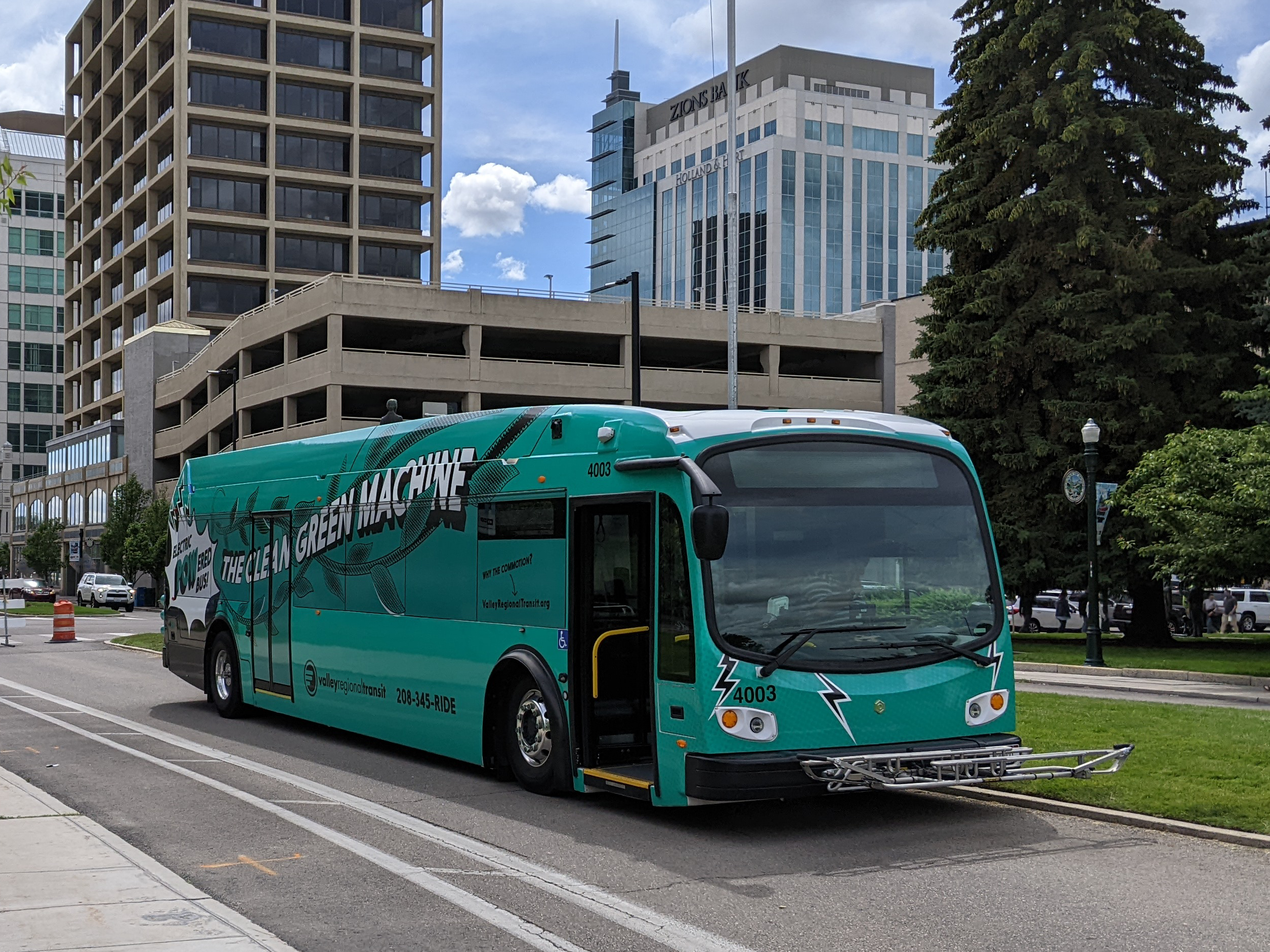
A VRT electric bus

In January 2020, Valley Regional Transit agreed to buy 12 battery electric buses from Proterra. The buses were expected to enter service in 2021 on a new route in Meridian; it was to be the first to serve the downtown Meridian area. The first four electric buses debuted in October 2021.

Valley Regional Transit introduced the City Go integrated fare payment system in November 2021. It uses the Umo platform and comprises a smart card and mobile ticketing app. Longer-term plans for the agency include increasing frequency on its most used routes, upgrading its maintenance facility, and improving bus stops. Additionally, depending on the success of the on-demand pilot in Canyon County, a similar program could be considered for Boise.

VRT was the recipient of a $11.6 million grant from local semiconductor manufacturer Micron Technology in 2026 that will be used to launch the agency's first bus route with seven-day service.

== Fares ==
VRT offers a contactless smart card and mobile app under the City Go brand as methods to pay for rides, and also accepts cash and preloaded stored-value cards. The City Go app can be used to purchase passes, while the card can store a reloadable balance and features fare capping.

As of March 2023, fares are as follows:

Fare Type	Local	Universal
Single ride	$1.50	$4.50
Day pass	$2.50	$7.50
31-day pass	$42	$90
Year pass	$282	$594

Local fares apply to all routes except for 40. This express intercounty route requires a universal fare. For youth, seniors, and people with disabilities, the single ride, day pass, and 31-day passes are offered for half price.

== Routes ==
=== Ada County ===
Routes within Ada County mainly originate from Main Street Station or nearby along Main Street, although some routes originate from shopping centers.

Route	Name	From	Via	To	Notes
2	Broadway	Main Street Station		Boise Airport	Has Saturday service
3	Vista	Main Street Station		Boise Airport	Has Saturday service
4	Franklin	Main Street Station		Towne Square Mall	
5	Emerald	Main Street Station		Towne Square Mall	Has Saturday service
7	Fairview	Main Street Station		Towne Square Mall	Has Saturday service
8	Chinden	Main Street Station		Discovery & Chinden	
9	State Street	Main Street Station		Gary & State	Has Saturday service
10	Hill Road	Main Street Station		State & Ellens Ferry	
16	VA/15th Street	Main Street Station	VA Medical Center	Parkhill & Bogus Basin	
17	Warm Springs/Parkcenter	Main Street Station		Millspur Way	
20	Orchard	Boise Airport		36th & Shasta	Has Saturday service
21	Cole/Glenwood	Towne Square Mall		Gary & State	Has Saturday service
24	Ustick/Maple Grove	Towne Square Mall		The Village at Meridian	
28	Cole/Victory	Towne Square Mall		Pro Tech at Frank Church High School	
29	Overland	Main Street Station	Boise State Transit Center	Towne Square Mall	Has Saturday service
30	Pine	The Village at Meridian		Ten Mile Crossing	

=== Canyon County ===
Route	Name	From	Via	To	Notes
150	Nampa/Caldwell On-Demand	On-demand route in and around Nampa and Caldwell			Rides must be booked online or through the phone. Replaces three previous fixed-route services

=== Intercounty ===
Route	Name	From	Via	To	Notes
40	Caldwell/Boise Express	College of Idaho	Happy Day Transit Center, Idaho & 9th, Main Street Station	Boise State Transit Center	Runs clockwise within downtown Boise in the morning, counterclockwise in the afternoon
42	Happy Day to Towne Square Mall	Happy Day Transit Center	College of Western Idaho	Towne Square Mall	
45	Boise State/CWI	College of Western Idaho	Ten Mile Crossing, The Village at Meridian	Boise State Transit Center	

== Facilities ==
=== Main Street Station ===
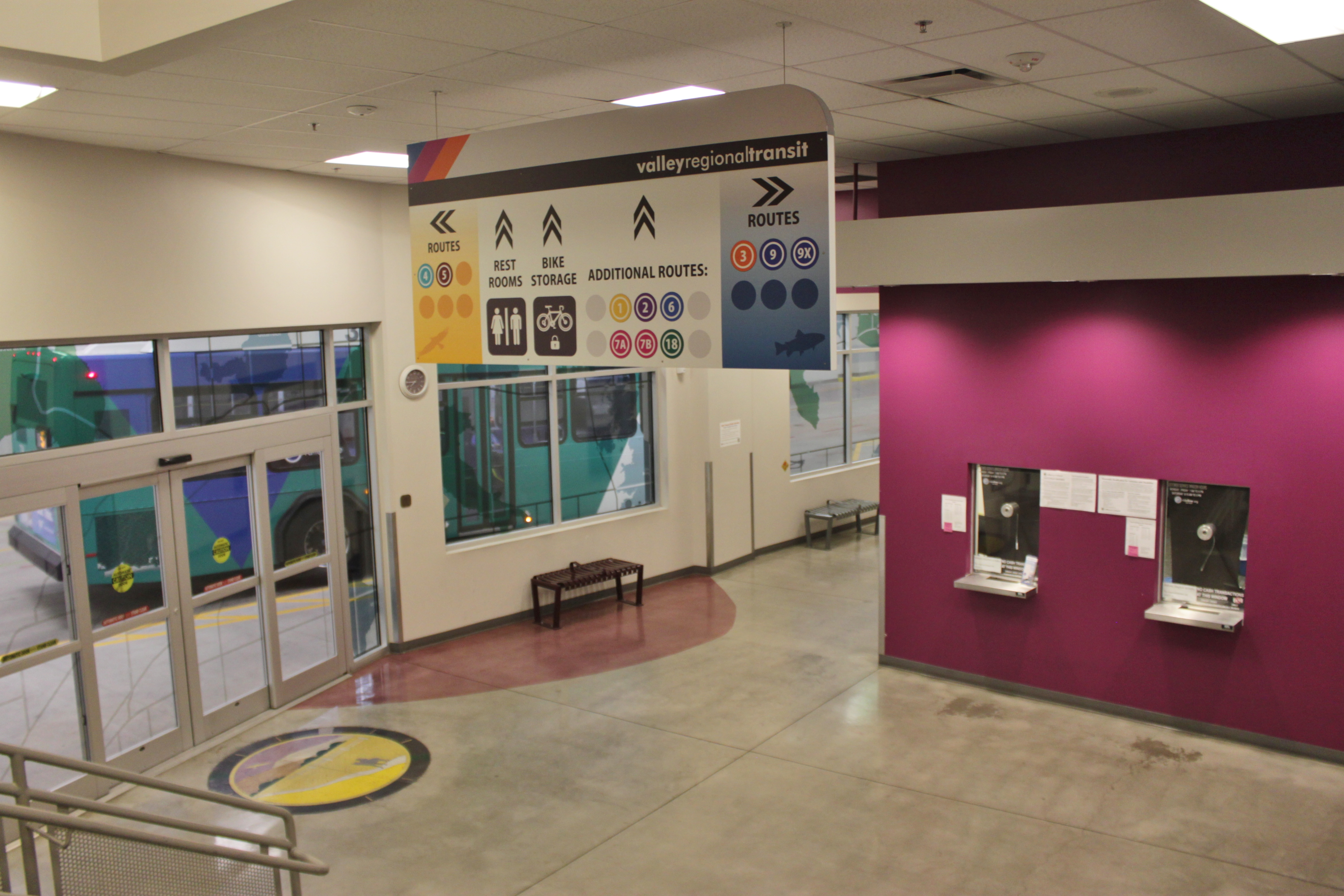
The lobby of Main Street Station

Located underground beneath City Center Plaza in downtown Boise, Main Street Station serves as Boise's main transit center. The majority of services within the city arrive underground at the station's eight bays, although some arrive above ground on Main Street. In addition to VRT buses, Boise State University shuttle buses also serve the station, as the university's computer science department occupies two floors of the City Center Plaza building. These free shuttle buses run in a loop between Main Street Station and the Boise State Transit Center. Main Street Station opened on October 24, 2016.

== Programs ==
VRT also operates Safe Routes to School Treasure Valley.

== Ridership ==
The ridership statistics shown here are of fixed route services only and do not include demand response.
