= Ventra =

Public transit smart card used in Chicago, Illinois

- Location: Chicago metropolitan area
- Launched: 2013
- Technology: Contactless smart card
- Operator: Cubic Transportation Systems
- Manager: Northern Illinois Transit Authority
- Currency: United States dollar
- Stored-value: Pay-per-ride and/or passes
- Validity: Chicago Transit Authority; Pace Suburban Bus; Metra
- Retailed: Online; Telephone; Vending machines; Authorized merchants
- Variants: Ventra Ticket; Personal bank-issued credit or debit cards
- Website: ventrachicago.com

Ventra is an electronic fare payment system for two of the three service boards of the Northern Illinois Transit Authority (NITA): the Chicago Transit Authority (CTA) and Pace. It replaced the Chicago Card and the Transit Card automated fare collection systems. Ventra (purportedly Latin for "windy," though the actual Latin word is ventosa) launched in August 2013, with a full system transition occurring in July 2014. Ventra includes several options for payment, including a contactless smart card powered by RFID, a single day or use ticket powered by RFID, a personal bank-issued credit card or debit card that has an RFID chip, or a compatible mobile phone. Ventra is operated by Cubic Transportation Systems. A smartphone app allows users to manage fares, buy passes, and also buy mobile tickets for NITA's commuter rail service board, Metra.

== History ==
In November 2011, the Chicago Transit Board approved a $454 million, 12-year contract for an Open Standards Fare System, making it the largest automated fare collection contract ever placed in North America. The contract was structured such that Chicago Transit Authority (CTA) was able to implement the system with no upfront costs. The new fare system is viewed to be the backbone for the universal fare system the Illinois General Assembly mandated by 2015 for the CTA, Metra, and Pace, according to CTA President Forrest Claypool.

Metra was offered the opportunity to participate in the Ventra program during meetings with the CTA, but the commuter railroad initially declined. Reports in August 2012 stated that Metra was considering its options, and in August 2013 Metra officially announced it would begin planning to accept Ventra.

== Roll out and public reception ==
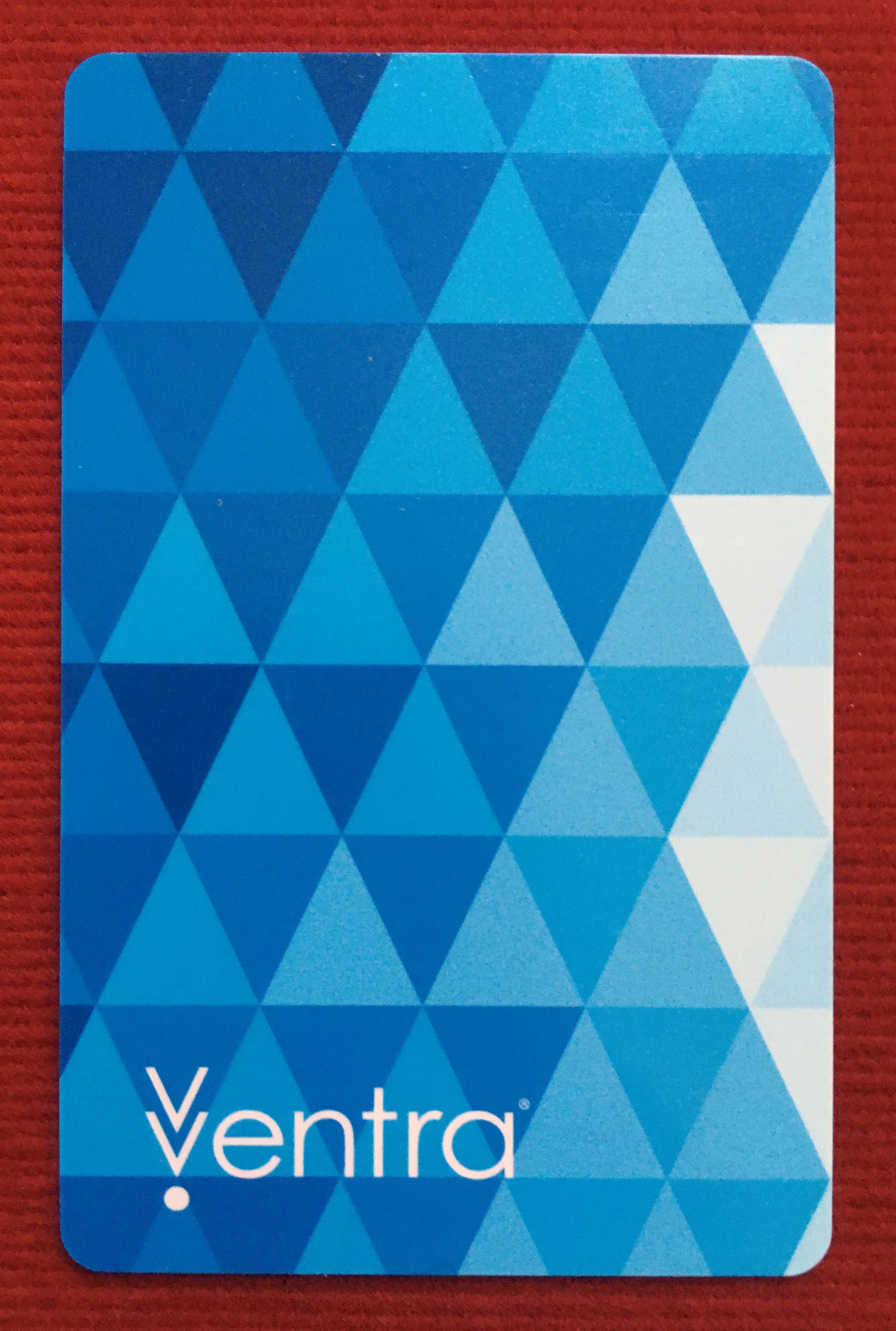
Current iteration of a Ventra card

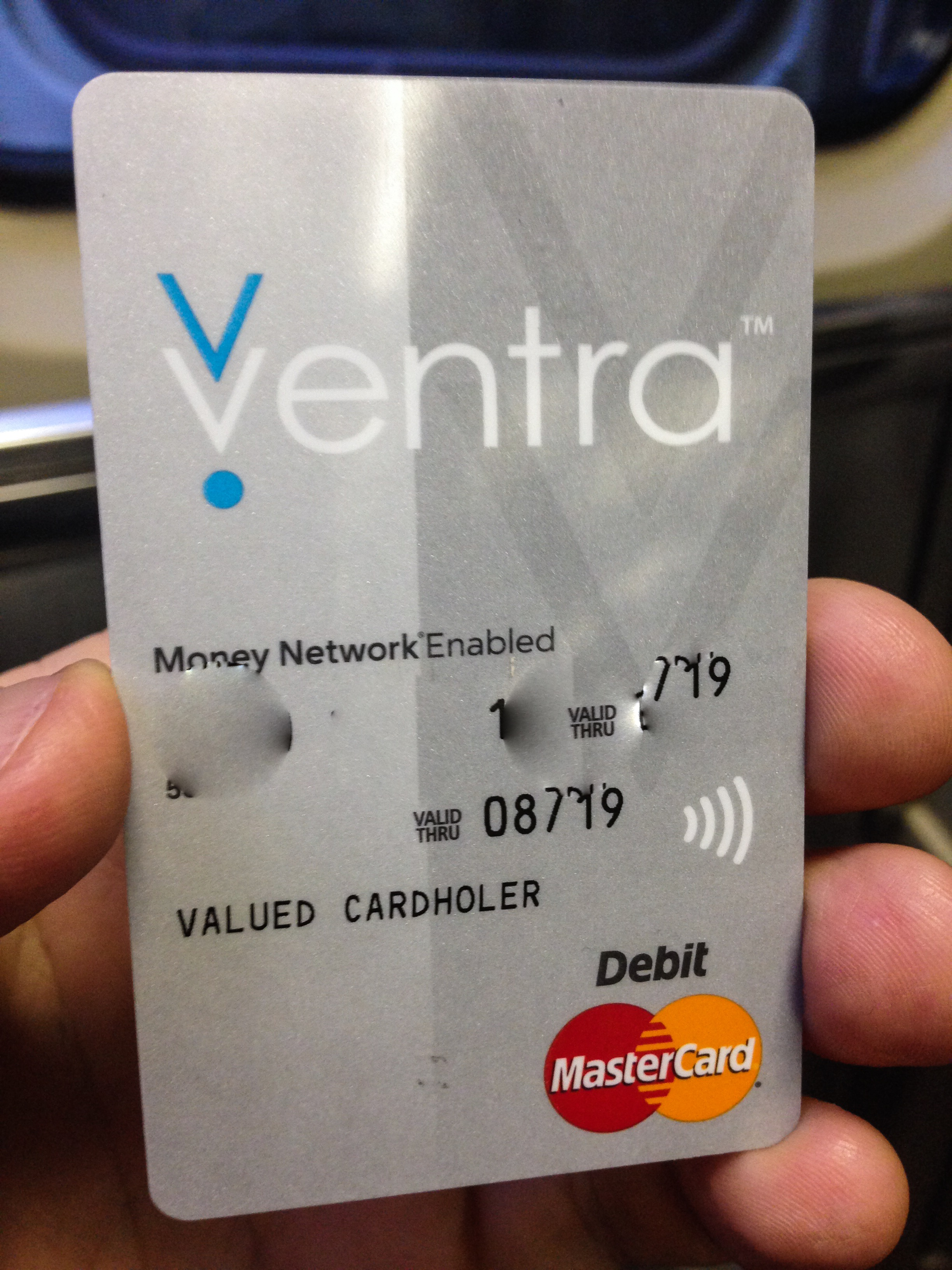
An older iteration of the Ventra Card, which also had the ability to act as a MasterCard debit card. This function was disabled on later versions due to overall disuse.

Residents and local media were critical of the lack of communication from the CTA regarding Ventra, but CTA officials said they planned to do extensive public outreach before it was activated.

Post-activation, users have reported a number of problems: cards taking as long as five weeks to arrive in the mail, cards that did not work even after payments were applied, issues activating cards, and calling the Ventra customer service line and waiting on hold for half an hour or more—or being disconnected while waiting on hold. In response to issues during the roll out of Ventra the CTA announced on October 9, 2013, that it would reinstate the ability to add money to the old fare options until issues with the roll out were corrected. At the time CTA also announced that the December 15, 2013 deadline for the complete transition was still in effect.

A Ventra system outage that occurred during rush hour on November 13, 2013 required the CTA to waive fares for an estimated 15,000 rides, with passengers boarding trains by showing their Ventra cards to station attendants. The outage was due to a back-office server issue at the contractor's office. The CTA stated that it would be seeking payment for the lost revenue from Cubic at a value of $33,750.

The final transition to Ventra was postponed indefinitely in early November, from the original December 15, 2013, date, due to the persistent issues with the roll out. In early 2014, CTA and Pace both announced plans to resume the final rollout, with a full transition to Ventra expected by July 2014.

The CTA stated in early November 2013 that no payments would be made to Cubic until customer service line wait times are under five minutes, transactions at entry take less than 2.5 seconds for 99% of transactions, and that 99% of the new equipment is functioning.

== Ventra app ==
In 2015, the Chicago-area agencies, including Metra, CTA, and Pace launched the Ventra app, which allows customers to use mobile ticketing to pay for rides on all three transit systems from their mobile devices. One other agency using similar fare payment technology through a mobile application includes the San Francisco Municipal Transportation Agency. The Ventra app allows customers to perform the same functions for the CTA as the desktop version including managing Ventra accounts, reloading cards and buying passes. It also has a transit tracker. The difference is the app allows customers to buy Metra tickets including single ride, ten-ride, weekend and monthly passes. Metra provides about 300,000 trips per day. Nearly 60 percent of riders use monthly passes. In August, the most recent month for which figures were available, Metra sold some 94,000 monthly passes.

With the app, customers can manage their Ventra transit accounts, buy mobile tickets to ride Metra trains, and receive notifications when their account balances are low or when unlimited-ride passes are due to expire. There is also a "Transit Tracker" feature that enables customers to view schedules and arrival times for Metra, CTA and Pace.

Two months after the Ventra app's launch in late January 2016, Metra customers had taken more than 1 million rides using mobile tickets. The 1 millionth ride was taken January 19, exactly two months after the app was launched. The mobile pay capability could potentially extend to letting travelers coordinate and pay for multiple modes of transportation.

Customers are now able to download a virtual Ventra Card onto their NFC-compatible mobile devices, allowing them to access their Ventra transit account to pay for rides on CTA trains and CTA and Pace buses directly from the app by touching their smartphone or other mobile device to a Ventra reader.

According to the CTA, the Ventra app has been well-received, based on customer feedback and its increasing number of downloads. While there was no official target set for the number of downloads the CTA hoped the app would get, it saw more than 20,000 downloads its first day. More than 1,300 Metra ticket purchases were made through the app, which represented nearly 9,600 Metra tickets (accounting for 10-ride purchases as 10 tickets), and more than 5,000 new Ventra accounts were created in the app the day it launched.

Riders can download the app on Apple and Android smartphones from the Apple App Store and Google Play. Fares can be paid for using a credit or debit card or a Ventra account. Officials said it is worth creating an account because it expedites buying passes or tickets, and fares can be recovered if the fare card is stolen or lost.

Towards the end of October 2020, the CTA announced that Ventra would be available within an Apple Pay wallet, allowing a customer's card to be scanned on an iPhone or Apple Watch device, with the caveat that the customer's plastic Ventra card would no longer be able to be used. In June 2021, this functionality was extended to Google Wallet on Android devices.

== See also ==
- List of public transport smart cards
