= MetroCard =

Public transit payment system (1994–2025)

- Location: New York City, United States
- Launched: January 6, 1994
- Discontinued: December 31, 2025 (sales and refills)
- Predecessor: Token and change
- Successor: OMNY
- Technology: Magnetic stripe
- Operator: Metropolitan Transportation Authority
- Manager: Metropolitan Transportation Authority
- Currency: USD ($100 (Note: For unlimited-ride cards, one can make a theoretically infinite number of trips for a fixed price, depending on whether one buys the 7-Day Unlimited or 30-Day Unlimited cards. For pay-per-ride cards, the maximum initial amount is $100.) maximum load)
- Stored-value: Pay-Per-Ride
- Auto recharge: EasyPayXPress
- Unlimited use: Unlimited Ride
- Validity: Rail: AirTrain JFK New York City Subway PATH Staten Island Railway Bus: Bee-Line Hudson Rail Link MTA New York City Bus and MTA Bus Nassau Inter-County Express Other: Roosevelt Island Tramway
- Retailed: Vending machines Stations Online MetroCard buses and vans Authorized merchants
- Variants: SingleRide Reduced-Fare Student Fair Fares NYC
- Website: http://web.mta.info/metrocard

The MetroCard is a discontinued magnetic stripe card used for fare payment on transportation in the New York City area. It was a payment method for the New York City Subway (including the Staten Island Railway), New York City Transit buses, and MTA buses. Several partner agencies also accepted the MetroCard: Nassau Inter-County Express (NICE Bus), the PATH train system, the Roosevelt Island Tramway, AirTrain JFK, and Westchester County's Bee-Line Bus System.

The MetroCard was introduced in 1994 to enhance the technology of the transit system and eliminate the burden of carrying and collecting tokens. The MTA discontinued the use of tokens in the subway on May 3, 2003, and on buses on December 31, 2003.

The MetroCard was phased out at the end of 2025. It was replaced by OMNY, a contactless payment system where riders pay for their fare by waving or tapping credit or debit bank cards, smartphones, or MTA-issued smart cards. MetroCard distribution, sales, and ability to add value or passes ended by December 31, 2025. Remaining kiosks and turnstile systems will continue to operate until they are discontinued, the exact date to be announced later in 2026. 7-day or 30-day Unlimited Ride passes must begin use by March 31, 2026 to get the full term of use.

The MetroCard was managed by a division of the MTA known as Revenue Control, MetroCard Sales, which was part of the Office of the Executive Vice President. The MetroCard Vending Machines are manufactured by Cubic Transportation Systems, Inc. As of early 2019, the direct costs of the MetroCard system had totaled $1.5 billion.

== History and fares ==
The idea for a farecard with a magnetic strip for the MTA system was proposed in 1983. It was the "highest priority" for then-MTA Chairman Richard Ravitch. The card would replace the tokens that were, at the time, used to pay transit fares. This plan was generally supported by the public. In 1984, Ravitch's successor Bob Kiley said that he would try to create a system for the new farecards within the next four years. However, bureaucratic actions and disagreements delayed the rollout of the system. In March 1990, the MTA board voted to allocate funding for the magnetic fare collection system. Three months later, the New York state legislature voted to allow the MTA to proceed for its plans for the new system. By 1991, the token technology was becoming dated: almost all other transit systems were using magnetic farecards, which were found to be much cheaper than the token system. In July of that year, the MTA board approved the roll-out of the magnetic farecard system. The MTA opened a request for bids to furnish and operate the farecard system, and Cubic Transportation Systems offered the lowest bid at $100 million.

On October 30, 1992, the installation of Automated Fare Collection turnstiles began. The farecard system was given the name MetroCard by April 1993. At the time, the first subway stations were supposed to receive MetroCard-compatible turnstiles before year's end, and buses were scheduled to be retrofitted with MetroCard collection equipment by late 1995. On June 1, 1993, MTA distributed 3,000 MetroCards in the first major test of the technology for the entire subway and bus systems. Less than a year later, on January 6, 1994, MetroCard-compatible turnstiles opened at Wall Street on the IRT Lexington Avenue Line (4 and 5 trains) and Whitehall Street–South Ferry on the BMT Broadway Line (N, R, and W trains). All MetroCard turnstiles were installed by May 14, 1997, when the entire bus and subway system accepted MetroCard.

On September 28, 1995, buses on Staten Island started accepting MetroCard, and by the end of 1995, MetroCard was accepted on all New York City Transit buses.

View source data.
View source data.

Before 1997, the MetroCard design was blue with yellow lettering. These blue cards are now collector's items. On July 4, 1997, the first free transfers were made available between bus and subway at any location with MetroCard. This program was originally billed as MetroCard Gold. Card colors changed to the current blue lettering on goldenrod background. On January 1, 1998, bonus free rides (10% of the purchase amount) were given for purchases of $15 or more. On July 4, six months later, 7-Day and 30-Day Unlimited Ride MetroCards were introduced, at $17 and $63, respectively. A 30-day Express Bus Plus MetroCard, allowing unlimited rides on express buses in addition to local buses and the subway, was also introduced at $120. The 1-Day Fun Pass was introduced on January 1, 1999, at a cost of $4. The debut of the MetroCard allowed the MTA to add bonus fare incentives, such as free bus transfers to other buses or subways. Half of the ridership increase between 1997 and 1999 was attributed to these incentives.

The first MetroCard Vending Machines (MVMs) were installed on January 25, 1999, in two stations, and by the end of 1999 347 MVMs were in service at 74 stations. Retail stores also sold MetroCards; at the peak of the MetroCard's usage, more than 3,000 stores sold the product. On April 13, 2003, tokens were no longer sold. Starting May 4, 2003, tokens were no longer accepted, except on buses. The following fare increases were implemented:

- Base fare increased from $1.50 to $2.00
- 1-Day Unlimited MetroCard fare increased from $4 to $7
- 7-Day Unlimited MetroCard fare increased from $17 to $21
- 30-day Express Bus Plus was replaced with a 7-day Express Bus Plus card, which cost $33 each.
- 30-Day Unlimited MetroCard fare increased from $63 to $70
- The bonus for pay-per-ride increased to 20% of the purchase amount for purchases of $10 or more
- Tokens would be phased out, but for the next two months they acted as $1.50 credit towards a $2 bus ride.

On February 27, 2005, another fare hike occurred:

- 7-day Express Bus Plus increased by $8, to $41.
- 7-Day Unlimited increased by $3, to $24.
- 30-Day Unlimited increased by $6, to $76.

On April 1, 2007, MetroCard started to be accepted by the Westchester Bee-Line Bus System as all of its buses were now equipped with new fareboxes that could accept MetroCard.

On March 2, 2008, another set of fare increases was implemented:

- 1-Day Unlimited fare increased by 50 cents, to $7.50.
- 7-Day Unlimited fare increased by $1, to $25.
- 14-Day Unlimited was introduced for $47.
- 30-Day Unlimited increased by $5, to $81.
- The bonus for pay-per-ride decreased to 15% of the purchase amount for purchases of $7 or more.

On June 28, 2009, the agency had its second fare hike in as many years:

- The base fare and single-ride ticket increased by 25 cents, to $2.25.
- 1-Day Unlimited fare increased by 75 cents, to $8.25.
- 7-Day Unlimited fare increased by $7, to $27.
- 7-Day Express Bus Plus fare increased by $4, to $45.
- 14-Day Unlimited fare increased by $4.50, to $51.50.
- 30-Day Unlimited increased by $8, to $89.
- The minimum purchase for a pay-per-ride bonus rose to $8.

On December 30, 2010, the bonus value for Pay-Per-Ride decreased to 7% for every $10, and the 1-Day Fun Pass and the 14-Day Unlimited Ride were discontinued altogether. Additionally:

- 7-Day Unlimited fare increased by $2, to $29.
- 7-Day Express Bus Plus fare increased by $5, to $50.
- 30-Day Unlimited fare increased by $15, to $104.

In 2012, the MTA allowed advertisements to be printed on the fronts of MetroCards. The backs of MetroCards had already been used for advertisements since 1995. This change meant that advertisers could remove the MTA logo from the fronts of MetroCards.

As a result of Hurricane Sandy in October 2012, three free transfers were offered on the MetroCard. The first was between the Q22, the Q35, and the 2 and 5 trains at the Flatbush Avenue–Brooklyn College subway station. The second between the Q22, either the Q52 Limited or the Q53 Limited, and the A train at the Rockaway Boulevard station. Finally, a three-hour transfer window applied from transfers from any subway station to the Q22 or Q113 routes of MTA Bus, and then to the n31, n32, and n33 routes of NICE.

On December 19, 2012, the MTA voted for the following fare increases:

- Base fare and single-ride ticket increased by 25 cents, to $2.50.
- 7-Day Unlimited MetroCard fare increased by $1, to $30.
- 30-Day Unlimited MetroCard fare increased by $8, to $112.
- The bonus for a pay-per-ride MetroCard decreased from 7% to 5% but the cutoff for the bonus decreased from $10 to $5.

Starting February 20, 2013, people were able to refill cards with both time and value, so that when a MetroCard is filled with both an unlimited card and fare value, the unlimited ride portion is used first where applicable. If not started already, the unlimited ride period would begin when the card is next used, and when the unlimited period expires, the regular fare would be charged. On March 3, 2013, a $1 fee was imposed on new card purchases in-system in order to reduce the number of discarded MetroCards. However, MetroCards purchased through the Extended Sales retail network carry no new card fee.

On March 22, 2015, the MTA voted for the following fare increases:

- Base Fare increased by 25 cents, to $2.75;
- Express Bus fare increased, to $6.50;
- 7-Day Unlimited fare increased by $1, to $31;
- 7-Day Express Bus Plus fare increased by $7.25, to $57.25;
- 30-Day Unlimited increased by $4.50, to $116.50;
- Single Ride ticket increased by 50 cents, to $3.00; and:
- the bonus for a pay-per-ride MetroCard was increased to 11%.

On March 19, 2017, the following fare increases went into place:

- 7-Day Unlimited fare increased by $1, to $32;
- 7-Day Express Bus Plus fare increased by $2.25, to $59.50;
- 30-Day Unlimited increased by $4.50, to $121; and
- the bonus for a pay-per-ride MetroCard was reduced from 11% to 5%.

On October 23, 2017, it was announced that the MetroCard would be phased out and replaced by OMNY, a contactless fare payment system also by Cubic, with fare payment being made using Apple Pay, Google Wallet, debit/credit cards with near-field communication enabled, or radio-frequency identification cards. All buses and subway stations would use the OMNY system by 2020. However, support of the MetroCard is slated to remain until 2023.

In mid-2018, city officials tentatively agreed to start a program in which they would provide half-fare MetroCards to almost 800,000 New York City residents living below the federal poverty line. The program would start in January 2019, and the New York City allocated $106 million in fiscal year 2019 to subsidize the half-fare MetroCards for at least six months. After uncertainty over whether the program would be implemented, the half-fare MetroCards were rolled out starting on January 4, 2019. Initially, the reduced-fare MetroCards would be rolled out to 30,000 residents, though another 130,000 New Yorkers receiving SNAP benefits would also be allowed to receive the half-fare MetroCards in April 2019. However, in the revised plan, only a portion of the originally projected 800,000 residents (around 20%) would be eligible for the reduced-fare cards.

On April 21, 2019, the following fare increases went into place:

- Express Bus fare increased by 25 cents, to $6.75;
- 7-Day Unlimited fare increased by $1, to $33;
- 7-Day Express Bus Plus fare increased by $2.50, to $62;
- 30-Day Unlimited fare increased by $6, to $127; and
- the bonus for a pay-per-ride MetroCard was eliminated.

In August 2023, the following fare increases went into place:

- Base Fare increased by 15 cents, to $2.90
- Express Bus fare increased, to $7.00
- 7-Day Unlimited fare increased to $34
- 7-Day Express Bus Plus fare increased to $64.00
- 30-Day Unlimited fare increased to $132
- Single Ride ticket increased by 25 cents, to $3.25

The MetroCard itself cost $1.

== Retirement ==
In 2006, the MTA and Port Authority announced plans to replace the magnetic strip with smart cards.

On July 1, 2006, MTA launched a six-month pilot program to test the new contact-less smart card fare collection system, initially ending on December 31, 2006, but extended until May 31, 2007. This program was tested at all stations on the IRT Lexington Avenue Line and at four stations in the Bronx, Brooklyn and Queens. The testing system utilized Citibank MasterCard's Paypass keytags. This smart card system was intended to ease congestion near the fare control area by reducing time spent paying for fare. MTA and other transportation authorities in the region said they would eventually implement it system-wide.

=== OMNY ===
In October 2017, MTA signed a $573 million contract with Cubic Transportation Systems for OMNY (short for One Metro New York), a new fare payment system. This will use the contactless payment system, with riders waving or tapping credit or debit bank cards, smartphones, and/or MTA-issued smart cards to pay their fare. This contactless system was originally developed by Transport for London at a cost of £11 million (at the time equivalent to around $14 million), before being licensed to Cubic for worldwide sale. MTA expects to spend at least six years rolling out the system, with new electronic readers and vending machines. The new fare system would be rolled out on a limited basis in May 2019. It was intended that by 2024, the MetroCard would be phased out entirely, although this target has not been met.

On March 19, 2025, the MTA announced that sales and distribution of the MetroCard would end on December 31, 2025. Customers will still be able to continue using their MetroCards until turnstiles and vending machines are disassembled at a later date. In late 2025, stores stopped selling MetroCards, and the MTA hosted several events, including parties, to mark the MetroCard's retirement. In addition, coinciding with the retirement, the New York Transit Museum hosted an exhibit commemorating the MetroCard in December 2025. In addition, announcements made by Katseye, Andy Cohen, Oscar the Grouch from Sesame Street, and Ronnie Chieng were made announcing the MetroCard's retirement. By that month, all except 16 MetroCard Vending Machines had been removed. The last day of MetroCard sales was December 31, 2025, commemorated by a mock funeral at Washington Square Park. After MetroCard sales ceased, old MetroCards were listed for sale on eBay, sometimes for thousands of dollars each. MetroCard fully retired on Westchester Bee-Line buses on July 20, 2026. MetroCard acceptance on PATH ended September 1, 2026.

== Attributes ==
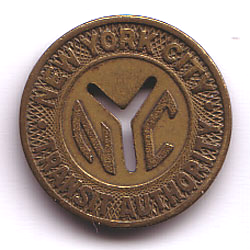
A NYCTA token

The cards were made of polyester. They measured 2.125 by 3.375 inches (5.40 cm × 8.57 cm) across and are 10 mils (0.010 in) in thickness. Each MetroCard had a chamfer or diagonal cutout at its top right corner, indicating which direction the MetroCard should have been oriented when it was swiped through a turnstile or inserted into a farebox machine. There was also a circular hole on the left side of the MetroCard; turnstiles and farebox machines used this hole to ensure that the card was being read correctly. During a swipe, the MetroCard was read, re-written to, then check-read to verify correct encoding.

Over the MetroCard's lifetime, 3.2 billion cards were manufactured, many in the United Kingdom. They were then encoded with stored value at a facility in Maspeth, Queens. Each MetroCard is assigned a unique, permanent ten-digit serial number when it is manufactured. The value is stored magnetically on the card itself, while the card's transaction history was held centrally in the Automated Fare Collection (AFC) Database. When a card was purchased and fares are loaded onto it, the MetroCard Vending Machine or station agent's computer stores the amount of the purchase onto the card and updates the database, identifying the card by its serial number. Whenever the card was swiped at a turnstile, the value of the card was read, the new value was written, the customer was let through, and then the central database was updated with the new transaction as soon as possible. Cards were not validated in real time against the database when swiped to pay the fare. The AFC Database was necessary to maintain transaction records to track a card if needed. It had actually been used to acquit criminal suspects by placing them away from the scene of a crime. The database also stored a list of MetroCards that have been invalidated for various reasons. Reasons include the MetroCard being lost, stolen, expired student, or an expired monthly card, and it distributed the list to turnstiles in order to deny access to a revoked card.

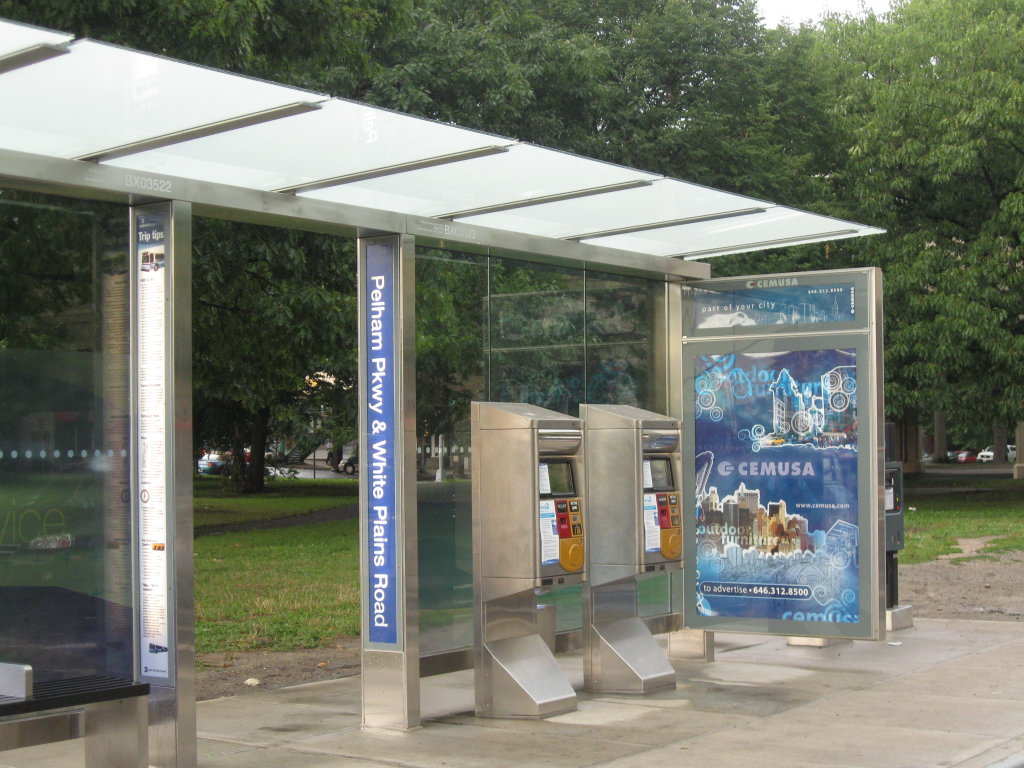
Select Bus Service pay shelter for pre-payment of fare before boarding Select Bus Service buses.

The older blue MetroCards were not capable of the many kinds of fare options that the gold ones offered. The format of the magnetic stripe used by the blue MetroCard offered very little other than the standard pay-per-swipe fare. Gold MetroCards allowed groups of people (up to four) to ride together using a single pay-per-swipe MetroCard. The gold MetroCard kept track of the number of swipes at a location in order to allow those same number of people to transfer at a subsequent location, if applicable. The MetroCard system was designed to ensure backward compatibility, which allowed a smooth transition from the blue format to gold.

Cubic later used the proprietary MetroCard platform to create the Chicago Card and Tren Urbano's fare card, which are physically identical to the MetroCard except for the labeling.

During the MetroCard's existence, several local artists used MetroCards in their work; including Nina Boesch, Shih-Pao Lin, and Thomas McKean. Within a month of the discontinuation of MetroCard sales, these artists reported having trouble finding remaining MetroCards.

== Card types ==
=== SingleRide Ticket ===
The SingleRide Ticket (introduced to replace subway tokens and single cash fares) was a piece of paper with a magnetic strip on the front, and with the date and time of purchase stamped on the back. They cost $3.25 for one subway or local bus ride, with one free transfer allowed between buses, issued by the bus operator upon request. SingleRide Tickets did not allow transfers between subways and buses. SingleRide tickets could only be purchased at MetroCard Vending Machines, which are usually located within subway stations, and expired two hours from time of purchase. Because of these limitations, SingleRide Tickets are not frequently used, having been used by only 3% of subway riders in 2009.

Although the Pay-Per-Ride MetroCard was accepted on PATH, the regular SingleRide ticket was not. However, a PATH SingleRide ticket was available from MVMs in PATH stations for $3.00, valid for two hours and only on PATH. PATH also accepted 2-Trip PATH MetroCards, which cost $6.00 and were also valid only on PATH.

=== Pay-Per-Ride MetroCard ===
The Pay-Per-Ride MetroCard cost $1, and could be filled with an initial value in any increment between $5.80 and $80, though vending machines only sold values in multiples of 5 cents. Cards could be refilled in 1-cent increments at station booths (formerly called token booths), and in 5-cent increments at vending machines. A MetroCard holder could spend up to $80 in one transaction and up to a total value of $100. Pay-Per-Ride MetroCards could also be filled with unlimited ride time in 7- or 30-day increments. As of 2022, station booths no longer did any MetroCard transactions.

The Pay-Per Ride MetroCard was accepted on the New York City Subway; MTA express, local, limited, and Select Bus Service buses; the Staten Island Railway, and Metro-North's Hudson Rail Link. Outside agencies also accept the MetroCard, including Nassau Inter-County Express; the PATH, operated by the Port Authority of New York and New Jersey; the AirTrain JFK, operated by the Port Authority; the Roosevelt Island Tramway; and the Westchester County Bee-Line Bus System. However, PATH did not accept reduced-fare MetroCard.

Pay-Per-Ride MetroCards deducted different values depending on which service was used. Subway, Staten Island Railway, Roosevelt Island Tramway, or local/limited/Select bus uses, cost $2.90 per trip and usually allowed one valid transfer, though two transfers may be allowed depending on which routes are being used (see below). Although the PATH charged $3.00 as well, it did not offer any free transfers. A ride on an MTA express bus cost $7.00, with transfers allowed to or from the subway, Staten Island Railway, or non-express MTA buses. The BxM4C Bee-Line Bus deducted $7.50 per trip, and no free or discounted transfers were allowed to or from that route. The AirTrain JFK cost $8.50 per trip if the passenger enters or leaves at Jamaica or Howard Beach–JFK Airport stations.

Transfers were available within two hours of initial entry, with the following structure:

- One free transfer from
  - subway to local bus
  - bus to subway
  - bus to local bus
  - express bus to express bus
  - bus or subway to Staten Island Railway
  - subway to subway between the Lexington Avenue–59th Street ( 4 5 6 <6> N R W trains) stations and the Lexington Avenue–63rd Street ( M Q trains) station or between Junius Street ( 3 4 train) station and Livonia Avenue ( L train) station
- Two consecutive free transfers are available with the MetroCard for certain transfers. The transfers must be made within two hours of each other (e.g. when one makes the first transfer, they have two hours to make the second transfer).
  - Between Staten Island bus routes crossing the Staten Island Railway, through St. George Ferry Terminal, and then any MTA local bus or NYC subway service below Fulton Street in Lower Manhattan.
  - Between certain bus routes as specified in MetroCard § Designated multiple-transfer corridors
- $4.10 for each local bus or subway to express bus transfer.
- Transfers with coins (pennies and half-dollar coins not accepted) are good for use on one connecting local bus route (restrictions apply).
- Customers transferring to suburban buses from another system with a lower base fare must pay the difference between the fare on the first bus and the fare on the second bus.
- No transfers to the BxM4C.
- No free transfer between PATH and NYC Subway, Bus and MTA Bus.
- Up to 4 people can ride together on a single Pay-Per-Ride MetroCard, with one free transfer granted.

Expired card balance may be transferred to a new card at any MetroCard Vending Machine, up to one year after expiration. After one year the card must be sent to the Customer Claims area of the MTA.

=== EasyPayXPress MetroCard ===
The EasyPayXPress MetroCard functions like a pay per ride or unlimited MetroCard, but is automatically refilled from a linked credit or debit card. An EasyPayXpress account is opened with either $30 or a 30-day unlimited balance of $121. As of January 2015, another $45 is automatically added for Pay-Per-Ride customers when balance drops below $20. To reduce this, a one-time payment may be made online before the balance drops below $20. All rules for standard pay per ride or unlimited cards apply, and EasyPay customers can review the account and ride usage online. Reduced-fare EasyPay version converts from Pay-Per-Ride to Unlimited rides (during that billing cycle) once the value of fares used meet or exceed the cost of a reduced-fare 30-Day Unlimited Ride card. Express bus fares do not contribute, and EasyPay cannot be used on PATH trains. As of March 2025, the EasyPayXPress Metrocard has been discontinued in favor of the new OMNY System.

=== AirTrain JFK Discount MetroCard ===
The AirTrain JFK Discount MetroCard offered ten trips on AirTrain JFK at $26.50. This card was only purchased at specially marked MetroCard Vending Machines. It could be refilled, and once done so, became a Pay-Per-Ride MetroCard. However, although the AirTrain fare is also payable using a regular Pay-Per-Ride MetroCard, no discount is given for Pay-Per-Ride cards. There was also an unlimited-ride 30-day card that costed $40 and was only valid on AirTrain JFK. These discounts were replaced by OMNY in June 2026.

=== Unlimited MetroCard ===
As of 2023, four types of Unlimited-ride MetroCards was sold:

- 7-Day Unlimited Ride Card, $34 for unlimited subway and local bus rides until midnight on the seventh day following first usage.
- 30-Day Unlimited Ride Card, $132 for unlimited subway and local bus rides until midnight on the thirtieth day following first usage.
- 7-Day Express Bus Plus Card, $64 for unlimited express bus, local bus, and subway rides until midnight on the seventh day following first usage.
- 30-Day AirTrain JFK Unlimited Ride Card, $40 for unlimited trips on the AirTrain (operated by the Port Authority of New York and New Jersey) until midnight on the thirtieth day from first usage. This card can only be purchased at specially marked MetroCard Vending Machines at the Howard Beach–JFK Airport ( A train) or Sutphin Boulevard–Archer Avenue–JFK Airport ( E J Z trains) stations and at MetroCard vendors in JFK Airport. There are no transfer privileges with this card as it only works on the AirTrain. This is the only unlimited card accepted on the AirTrain.

Any Unlimited Ride Card cannot be used at the same subway station or bus route for 18 minutes after it is swiped. Every MetroCard can be refilled in increments of 7 or 30 days' worth of unlimited ride time, or with pay-per-ride value, but time is used before value unless the time on the card cannot be applied to the ride taken. The 7 Day Express Bus Plus card is the only unlimited card that can be used on express buses. Unlimited rides cannot be applied to non-MTA transit systems such as the PATH or AirTrain JFK; to use these systems that require a value-based fare, riders can load money on their Unlimited Ride MetroCard by selecting "Add Value" when refilling at a MetroCard Vending Machine or at a station booth. Turnstiles for these systems will simply deduct the fare from the value portion of the MetroCard. 30-Day Unlimited and 7-Day Express Bus Plus Cards that are purchased using a credit, debit or ATM card from a MetroCard vending machine can be reported lost or stolen to receive a pro-rated credit for the card.

Standard 7- and 30-day unlimited cards were accepted on MTA New York City Subway; Metro-Norths's Hudson Rail Link ;non-express buses from either the MTA, NICE, or Bee-Line; the Roosevelt Island Tramway; and the Staten Island Railway. 7-Day Express Bus Plus is accepted on MTA express buses. The AirTrain JFK only accepts the Unlimited AirTrain JFK card.

=== Student MetroCard ===
The Student MetroCard was issued to New York City public and private school students who live within the city limits. It allowed free access to the NYCT buses and trains, depending on the distance traveled between their school and their home. The card program was managed by the NYCDOE Office of Pupil Transportation. In NYC, these cards were replaced by Student OMNY cards. In Nassau County, Student MetroCards are issued by individual schools which have pre-paid for the cards. In Westchester County, cards are also issued, but cost $58 per month, or $580 a school year.

The DOE issued different colors of cards to students who live in New York City. Orange cards were given to students who are in grade K-6. Green cards were given to students who are in grades 7–12. Student MetroCards were allowed on the New York City Subway, non-express MTA buses, and the Staten Island Railway. Formerly, there was also a half-fare card that could only be used on non-express buses, discontinued in mid-2019. Red cards were issued to students and parents when there is a school bus work stoppage. Blue-and-purple cards are issued to Nassau County students and are only allowed to use the cards on NICE buses. Up to three trips per day may be made on student MetroCards, though four-trip MetroCards can be authorized individually for students who must make more than one transfer between home and school.

Students who received a student MetroCard must live:

- More than 0.5 miles away if they are in grades K–2
- More than 1.0 miles away if they are in grades 3–6
- More than 1.5 miles away if they are in grades 7–12

In May 2019, the MTA voted to phase out the half-fare student MetroCard and distribute only full-fare cards for students who qualify for a MetroCard.

=== Disabled/Senior Citizen Reduced-Fare MetroCard ===
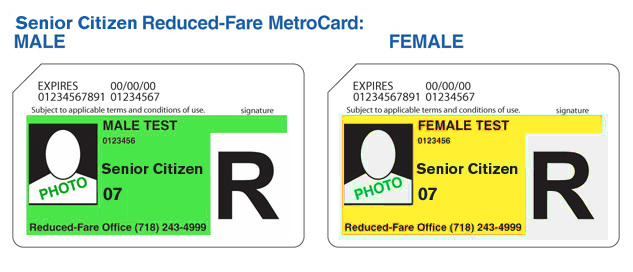
Senior Reduced-Fare MetroCard (Male & Female) (Back)

Senior citizen MetroCards are received via application or by submitting the application in person with required ID and copies of proof of age at the NYC Transit Customer Service Center at 3 Stone St in lower Manhattan and act as a combination photo ID and MetroCard. It allows half-fare within the MTA system, and on express buses during off-peak hours only. Half fare is also available on the 7-day and 30-day Unlimited MetroCards. "Autogate" cards are issued to persons with mobility impairments and are accepted at wheelchair doors at selected stations. The card back is color-coded to indicate the gender of the card holder, and the card face is marked with "Photo ID Pass". Later issues of Senior Citizen and Disability MetroCards are uncolored (all white with black printing on back with photo, gold face remains unchanged) for gender neutral requests. Temporary replacement cards are purple with no photo, or blue for Autogate MetroCard holders, and the value cannot be refunded if the original card is stolen or lost. A Senior & Disabled Reduced-fare EasyPay (automatic refill) card is also available.

This type of card is accepted everywhere the Pay-Per-Ride or time-based MetroCard is, with two exceptions: it is not valid on the PATH, and it is not valid for ticket purchase on New York City-bound LIRR and Metro-North trains in the morning. Reduced-Fare MetroCards (in any variety) are also not accepted at PATH stations. Reduced-fare customers who do not have a MetroCard may purchase a full-fare round trip MetroCard from a subway station agent by presenting proof of eligibility.

This type of card caused complaints because it took up to three months to replace.

The Reduced Fare MetroCard began to transition to the MTA's new payment system OMNY and phased out their service use with MetroCard in late 2024.

=== Fair Fares MetroCard ===
The Fair Fares MetroCard pilot program was implemented in January 2019. These are distributed by Fair Fares NYC, which sends letters to eligible residents that meet the income criteria, including veteran students, New York City Housing Authority residents, City University of New York students, and residents who receive benefits from the Department of Social Services. These residents must then register online to receive the Fair Fare MetroCard. Holders of the Fair Fare MetroCard can purchase Pay-Per-Ride or time-based fares at half the regular price. This type of card is accepted only on local/limited/Select buses, the subway, and the Staten Island Railway.

The Department of Social Services (DSS) and Human Resource Administration (HRA), who are responsible for the enrollments of the Fair Fares NYC customers, began issuing OMNY to select customers as part of a pilot program in mid-2024. New Fair Fares customers began receiving OMNY cards from February 2025 onward; existing customers could either switch to an OMNY card immediately or continue to use their MetroCard until it expired.

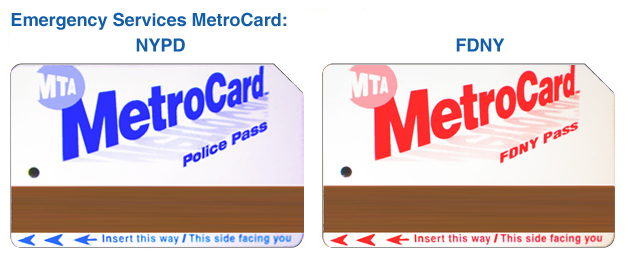
Front of NYPD and FDNY MetroCards

=== Emergency services ===
An emergency MetroCard was issued to police officers, firefighters, and emergency medical personnel while on duty so they could access the subway system during an emergency.

== Fares ==
=== Fare media ===
MetroCard is accepted on MTA Regional buses, the New York City Subway, Metro North's Hudson Rail Link, the Staten Island Railway, Roosevelt Island Tramway, AirTrain JFK, and Nassau Inter-County Express. Local MTA bus routes and NICE and Bee-Line buses also accept coins (though pennies and half-dollars are not accepted on Select Bus Service routes), while MTA buses, Hudson Rail Link, the Roosevelt Island Tram, Airtrain JFK, the subway, Nassau Inter-County Express, Bee-Line Bus, and the Staten Island Railway also accept OMNY. Westchester Bee-Line Bus accepts also accepts dollar bills of $1, $2, $5, and $10 as payment, but does not allow MetroCard as payment. As of January 2026, customers cannot buy or refill a MetroCard.

PATH only accepts TAPP (a clone of OMNY); however, TAPP cannot be used on any other transit system in New York City. PATH accepted MetroCards and SmartLink (a fare card) until September 1, 2026. The subway, Roosevelt Island Tram, the Staten Island Railway, and express buses only accept MetroCard and OMNY as payment.

As of December 31, 2020, all subway stations, the Staten Island Railway, (Note: St. George and Tompkinsville are the only stations on the Staten Island Railway where fares are collected to enter and exit.) and all MTA-operated buses are equipped with OMNY readers. As of January 2026, the only unlimited option available on OMNY is the 7-day fare cap, and 30-day options were discontinued except on Airtrain JFK.

	MetroCard	Coins	OMNY	TAPP
MTA local buses (Note: Including Limited-Stop and Select Bus Service buses.)	check	(Note: No half-dollar coins or pennies accepted on Select Bus Service buses.)	check	X mark
MTA express buses	check	X mark	check	X mark
NYC Subway	check	(Note: Cash is accepted for purchasing fare media at stations.)	check	X mark
Staten Island Railway	check	X mark	check	X mark
PATH	X mark	X mark	X mark	check
Roosevelt Island Tramway	check	X mark	check	X mark
AirTrain JFK	check	X mark	check	X mark
Nassau Inter-County Express	check	check	check	X mark
Westchester County Bee-Line	X mark	(Note: No pennies accepted.)	check	X mark

NYC Ferry and NJ Transit fares are paid using physical or digital tickets (in addition to cash on NJ Transit), which are not compatible with the MetroCard, OMNY, or any of the city's other modes of transport.

=== Base fares ===
All fares are in US dollars. Children under 44" tall ride for free with fare-paying rider; limit is 3 except for NYC Ferry and Express Buses.

Service	Fare type	Fare	Special fares
MTA Bus / NYC Bus (Local, Rush, Limited-Stop, Select Bus Service), (Note: The Q70 SBS is free.); NICE Bus, (Note: All Bee-Line and NICE services (including services signed as express) are local services for purposes of the fare except for the BxM4C.) NYC Subway, SIR, (Note: Staten Island Railway fares are collected only at St. George and Tompkinsville stations (in both directions). A second fare is not deducted for travel between St. George and Tompkinsville (except for SingleRide Tickets).) Roosevelt Island Tramway, Hudson Rail Link	Full	$3.00	$3.50 for a SingleRide Ticket
MTA Bus / NYC Bus (Local, Rush, Limited-Stop, Select Bus Service), NICE Bus, NYC Subway, SIR, Roosevelt Island Tramway, Hudson Rail Link	Reduced	$1.50	
Bee-Line Bus (except BxM4C),	Full	$3.00	
Bee-Line Bus (except BxM4C),	Reduced	$1.50	
PATH	Full	$3.25	$3.25 for a PATH SingleRide Ticket
PATH	Reduced	$1.50	$1.50 for PATH by using Senior TAPP
Express buses (MTA / NYC)	Full	$7.25	Children under 2 ride free when sitting on the parent's lap
Express buses (MTA / NYC)	Reduced (off-peak) (Note: Peak travel periods for express buses are 06:00–10:00 a.m. and 3:00–7:00 p.m. weekdays except holidays.)	$3.85	
BxM4C bus	Full	$7.75	
BxM4C bus	Reduced (off-peak)	$3.85	
Student OMNY card (Note: Student OMNY cards are distributed by New York City schools, are valid for one calendar year.: OMNY cards are good for 4 trips a day on MTA local buses, subways, Staten Island Railway, Roosevelt Island Tram, and Hudson Rail Link.; OMNY cards can be used at any time of day throughout the year.)		Free	
NICE Student Fare (Note: The NICE Student Fare requires a NICE student pass, which is issued to students, on request, by their school system. Valid weekdays 6:00 a.m. to 7:00 p.m. during the school year, for travel to and from school only.)		$2.25	
NYC Ferry		$4.50	$1.45 for anyone eligible in the Ferry & Student Discount Programs
AirTrain JFK		$8.75	
Access-A-Ride (NYC paratransit)		$3.00	
Able-Ride (Nassau County paratransit)		$4	$60 for a book of 20 tickets plus one free ticket

=== Unlimited-ride fares ===
The only unlimited option as of January 2026 is the fare cap system. On local transit (subways, buses, the Roosevelt Island Tramway, and the Staten Island Railway), the fare cap is $35 a week ($17.50 for reduced-fare customers). After paying that amount within seven days of an initial tap, customers receive unlimited rides for the rest of that seven-day period. Express buses have a separate fare cap of $67 a week. Local transit fares do not count toward the express bus cap, and vice versa. Airtrain JFK started its farecap system and OMNY discounts (30-Day Fare Cap — $43.50 max and Group Fare — up to 5 riders for $26.75 max) on June 11, 2026.

Between February 28, 2022, and August 20, 2023, Monday-to-Sunday fare capping applied on OMNY. Users of OMNY paid the base fare on buses, subways, and the Staten Island Railway until they had paid a total amount equal to the cost of the 7-Day Unlimited MetroCard option for fares within a single week (from Monday to Sunday), upon which they did not pay fares for subsequent trips. As of March 2022, this meant that full-fare passengers paid $2.75 for each of the first 12 trips made in a week; after they had paid for 12 trips, their fare payment medium became an unlimited-fare on the 13th tap. Reduced-fare customers were also eligible for the unlimited cap by making 12 trips in a week at $1.35 per ride, for a total cost of $16.20. When the base fare was raised to $2.90 on August 21, 2023, the 7-day cap was modified to apply to any consecutive seven-day period. In addition, the fare cap was raised to $34, so riders paid $2.90 for their first 11 trips and $2.10 for their 12th trip.

=== Transfers ===
==== MetroCard and OMNY ====
All transfers with MetroCard or OMNY are free from bus to subway, local bus to local bus, and subway to local bus (only one transfer per fare paid unless otherwise stated below). For transfers from local bus or subway to express buses (except the BxM4C), a step-up charge of $4 is charged. Customers transferring to suburban buses from another system with a lower base fare must pay the difference between the fare on the first bus and the fare on the second bus. With coins, transfers are available to different local buses only, with some restrictions, and issued upon request when boarding only. All transfers are good for two hours and 18 minutes. The transfer system also includes Bee-Line and NICE services as buses, and the Roosevelt Island Tramway as subway (a Tramway-to-local-bus or Tramway-to-subway transfer is allowed). For trips originating on NICE buses, two free transfers were allowed using MetroCard, but only one free transfer is allowed using OMNY.

SingleRide tickets are valid for one ride within two hours after purchase on local buses and the subway. One bus-to-bus transfer is allowed; however, transfer between buses and subways in either direction are not allowed.

On the Select Bus Service routes except S79, customers paying with coins requiring a transfer must board via the front door and request a transfer from the operator. All other customers may board via any of the three doors on Select Bus Service buses.

Bee-Line customers needing to transfer to Connecticut Transit (I-Bus and route 11), Transport of Rockland (Tappan ZEExpress), Putnam Transit (PART 2), or Housatonic Area Regional Transit (Ridgefield-Katonah Shuttle) services must ask for a transfer, even if paying with MetroCard or OMNY. The BxM4C does not accept or issue any transfers.

NICE customers needing to transfer to City of Long Beach N69, Suffolk County Transit, or Huntington Area Rapid Transit services must ask for a transfer, even if paying with MetroCard or OMNY.

There are no free transfers to or from PATH.

==== Designated multiple-transfer corridors ====
Two transfers are available at several places. The transfers must be made within two hours in order or in reverse order, unless otherwise specified.

===== Multimodal =====
1. Between Staten Island bus routes crossing the Staten Island Railway; the Staten Island Railway through St. George Ferry Terminal; and then either the M15, M20, M55 buses or any subway stations below Fulton Street in Lower Manhattan.
2. Between the Bx11 or Bx35, the Bx19, and the subway at Simpson Street.
3. Between the Bx32, the Bx36, and the subway at Burnside Avenue.
4. Between the Bx30, either the Bx28 or Bx38, and the subway at Norwood–205th Street or certain bus routes connecting with the Bx28/Bx38.
5. Between the M104, the M42, and the subway at 42nd Street–Bryant Park/Fifth Avenue or Grand Central–42nd Street.
6. Between any bus route connecting with the M60/M101/M125; any of the M60, M101, or M125; and the subway at 125th Street and either Lexington Avenue, Lenox Avenue, or Frederick Douglass Boulevard.
7. Between the S59 or S78, the S79 SBS, and any connecting bus or subway route in Brooklyn.

When a Uniticket is purchased on the Long Island Rail Road or the Metro-North Railroad, passengers traveling to a valid Uniticket station may transfer to a local bus at that station without paying an additional fare. The reverse is true for Uniticket holders boarding a bus toward a valid Uniticket station.

===== Bus =====
1. Between the B11 and B6, and any connecting bus route on either line.
2. Between the B61 and B62, and certain connecting bus routes on either line.
3. Between the westbound Bx4A, the westbound Bx4, and certain bus routes connecting with the Bx4.
4. Between the Bx11, certain bus routes connecting with the Bx11/Bx40/Bx42, and the Bx40 and Bx42.
5. Between the Bx18A/B, the eastbound Bx11, and certain bus routes connecting with the Bx11.
6. Between the Bx18A/B, the eastbound Bx35, and certain bus routes connecting with the Bx35.
7. Between the Bx23, the Q50, and certain connecting bus routes on either line.
8. Between the Bx29; any of the Bx5, Bx12, Bx23 or Q50; and certain bus routes connecting with these routes.
9. Between the Bx29, the Bx12, and certain bus routes connecting with the Bx12.
10. Between the Bx35, certain bus routes connecting with the Bx35/Bx11, and the Bx11.
11. Between the Bx36, certain bus routes connecting with the Bx36/Bx40/Bx42, and the Bx40 and Bx42.
12. Between the M20 and M10, and certain connecting bus routes on either line.
13. Between the M55 and M5, and certain connecting bus routes on either line.
14. Between the M100, either the M101 or M125, and certain bus routes connecting with the M101 or M125.
15. Between the M104 and M42, and certain connecting bus routes on either line.
16. Between the M125, the Bx15, and certain connecting bus routes on either line.
17. In Queens, multi-transfer corridors using OMNY and MetroCard are limited to the following:
  1. Between the n20G, the n20H, n20X or n21, and then any connecting bus route.
  2. Between the Q4, Q5, Q42, Q84, Q85, Q86, Q87 and Q89 at Jamaica Center; the Q17, Q30, Q31 and Q75 in downtown Jamaica; and the Q2, Q36, Q43 and Q82 at 168th Street Bus Terminal. Additionally, the second transfer in both directions can be to a Q83 bus.
  3. Between the southbound Q27, the westbound Q83, and the subway (or vice versa). A second transfer is also available between certain connecting bus routes on the Q27, the southbound Q27, and the westbound Q83 (or vice versa).

A six-month pilot program starting in June 2025 for OMNY only (which ended in November): On any trip that began on a Queens bus route, a second free transfer was provided to riders who used the same card or device on all three legs. The third transfer had to take place within three hours of the first tap. Additional transfer corridors are listed in the NYCT Tariff.

===== Subway =====
Pay-Per-Ride MetroCard and OMNY customers cannot make subway-to-subway transfers by exiting the turnstile and entering again, with two exceptions:

- Upper East Side, Manhattan – Lexington Avenue/59th Street on the IRT Lexington Avenue and BMT Broadway Lines (4, 5, 6, <6>, N, R, and W trains) and Lexington Avenue/63rd Street on the 63rd Street lines (M and Q trains).
- Brownsville, Brooklyn – Livonia Avenue (L train) and Junius Street (34 train).

Until 2011, an extra out-of-system subway-to-subway transfer was allowed in Long Island City, Queens, between 23rd Street–Ely Avenue/Long Island City–Court Square on the IND Queens Boulevard and Crosstown Lines and 45th Road–Court House Square on the IRT Flushing Line. This transfer was eliminated with the opening of an in-system transfer passageway among the three stations. Additional out-of-system transfers are added on a case-by-case basis, usually whenever a regular transfer is unavailable due to construction. Past instances included two transfers in Williamsburg and Bedford–Stuyvesant, Brooklyn, due to the 14th Street Tunnel shutdown from 2019 to 2020; a transfer in Gravesend, Brooklyn, due to the BMT Sea Beach Line (N train)'s partial suspension from 2019 to 2020; and two transfers in Inwood, Manhattan, in 2019 due to the closure of the 168th Street station (1 train).

==== Transfer restrictions ====
There are restrictions on transfers, as noted below. The transfer rules and restrictions are identical for MetroCard and OMNY, where OMNY is available.

===== Bus =====
For Pay-Per-Ride MetroCard and OMNY customers, there is no free transfer back onto the same route on which the fare was initially paid, or between the following buses:

- No transfer in the opposite direction (but transfers are permitted to buses in the same direction):
  - M1, M2, M3, M4
  - M101, M102, M103
  - Bx1 and Bx2
- No transfer in either direction:
  - M96 and M106
  - Bx40 and Bx42
- No transfers between NICE bus routes that are not listed on the timetable of the route on which fare is paid. Essentially, one cannot transfer between bus routes that do not intersect.
- Express:
  - No transfers to/from BxM4C, even with a Pay-Per-Ride MetroCard.
  - No transfers between different Union Turnpike express buses (QM1, QM5, QM6, QM31, QM35, QM36) traveling in the opposite direction.

===== Between subway and bus =====
There are no subway-to-bus or bus-to-subway transfers allowed without a MetroCard or OMNY.

Prior to May 16, 2025, there was one exception:

- At the Rockaway Parkway Intermodal Center on the BMT Canarsie Line (L train), westbound B6, B82 Local, and B82 Select Bus Service customers arriving from East New York and Canarsie, eastbound B6 Local customers on trips terminating at Rockaway Parkway, and all B42 customers, were transported directly into the subway system's fare control without having to pass through turnstiles (as the former trolley line had a loop installed within fare control). Similarly, subway passengers could transfer to B42 and westbound B6 and B82 Local service without using a MetroCard or OMNY (westbound B82 SBS customers must still obtain proof of payment, but have a second transfer to another route). The subway platform was enclosed with fencing and turnstiles to prevent fare evasion.

==== NYC Ferry ====
As NYC Ferry uses a separate fare payment system from the rest of New York City's transportation system, it does not provide any free transfers to any other modes of transportation using MetroCard or OMNY. However, passengers can request one free transfer to a connecting NYC Ferry route, valid within 90 minutes of the passenger boarding the first route. Tickets are checked prior to boarding, when the boat arrives at the station.

=== MetroCard Bus Transfer ===
The MetroCard Bus Transfer is issued upon request to passengers who pay cash fares on buses accepting MetroCard. The transfer is inserted into the fare box on the second bus, which retains it. Westchester Bee Line bus system and Nassau Inter-County Express and MTA New York City Transit bus is free to transfer from one bus to another bus that is accepted with MetroCard. The bus transfer is paper like the SingleRide Metrocard. This transfer does not grant cash customers subway access.

For suburban transfers, if the fare paid to get the transfer is less than that required on the second bus, the difference must be paid on boarding. For transfers from NICE to New York City Transit, no step up fee is required.

The predecessor to the MetroCard bus transfer was the original bus transfer. These paper tickets allowed bus to bus transfers. Available in pads of several different colors for use at different times, boroughs or directions, they would be torn at a certain time-marked line to indicate when the transfer would expire. A version of this still exists today as the "General Order Transfer" (aka "block ticket") which is provided to customers as they leave the subway system during service disruptions to re-enter the system at another point (often via a shuttle bus).

== Purchase options ==
All new MetroCard purchases were charged a $1 fee, except to reduced-fare customers and those exchanging damaged/expired cards. This purchase fee does not apply to MetroCard refills.

=== Subway station booths ===
As of 2022, booths no longer handle any transactions, and station agents have been reassigned to other functions within the station. Prior to this booths staffed by MTA station agents (at specified time periods) are located in all MTA subway stations. Every type of MetroCard could be purchased at a booth, with the exception of the SingleRide ticket (purchased at the MetroCard Vending Machine) and MetroCards specific to other transit systems (AirTrain JFK and PATH). All booth transactions had to be in cash.

=== MetroCard vending machines ===
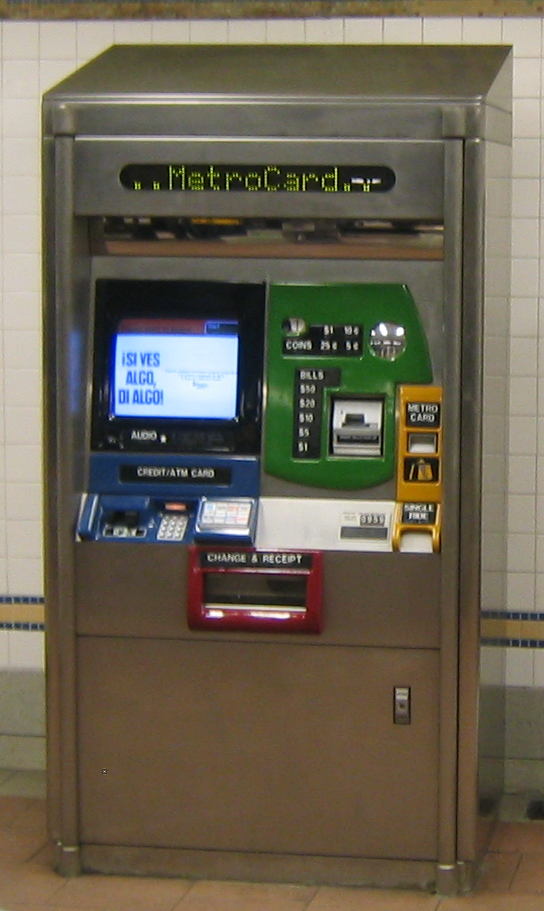
MetroCard Vending Machine

MetroCard Vending Machines (MVMs) are located in some in the Bronx, PATH stations (with the added ability to reload SmartLink cards), Staten Island Ferry terminals, Roosevelt Island Tramway stations, and, Eltingville Transit Center, and Terminals A and B at LaGuardia Airport.

MVMs debuted on January 25, 1999, and are found in two models. Standard MVMs accept cash, credit cards, and debit cards, and are located in every subway station. Cash transactions are required for purchases of less than $1, and they can return up to $9 in coin change (this amount was changed in later years to $6). MVMs can also reload previously issued MetroCards. MetroCard Express Machines (MEMs) are smaller MVMs that only accept credit and ATM/debit cards. Both models allow customers to purchase any type of MetroCard through a touchscreen. The machines also comply with the Americans with Disabilities Act of 1990, through use of Braille and a headset jack: audible commands for each menu item are provided once a headset is connected and the proper sequence is keyed through the keypad; all non-visual commands are then entered via the keypad instead of the touchscreen. The MEMs and MVMs are geared to allow a maximum of 2 transactions per day when payment is made by either credit or debit card. PATH fare vending machines (only in PATH stations) can dispense MetroCards. MetroCards that have expired can be exchanged using a MVM or MEM if done within one year of the expiration date printed on the back of the card. This is done by using the Refill option on the machine screen. Any cash value that is left on the expired card will be transferred to the new card. No fee is charged for a new MetroCard in this instance.

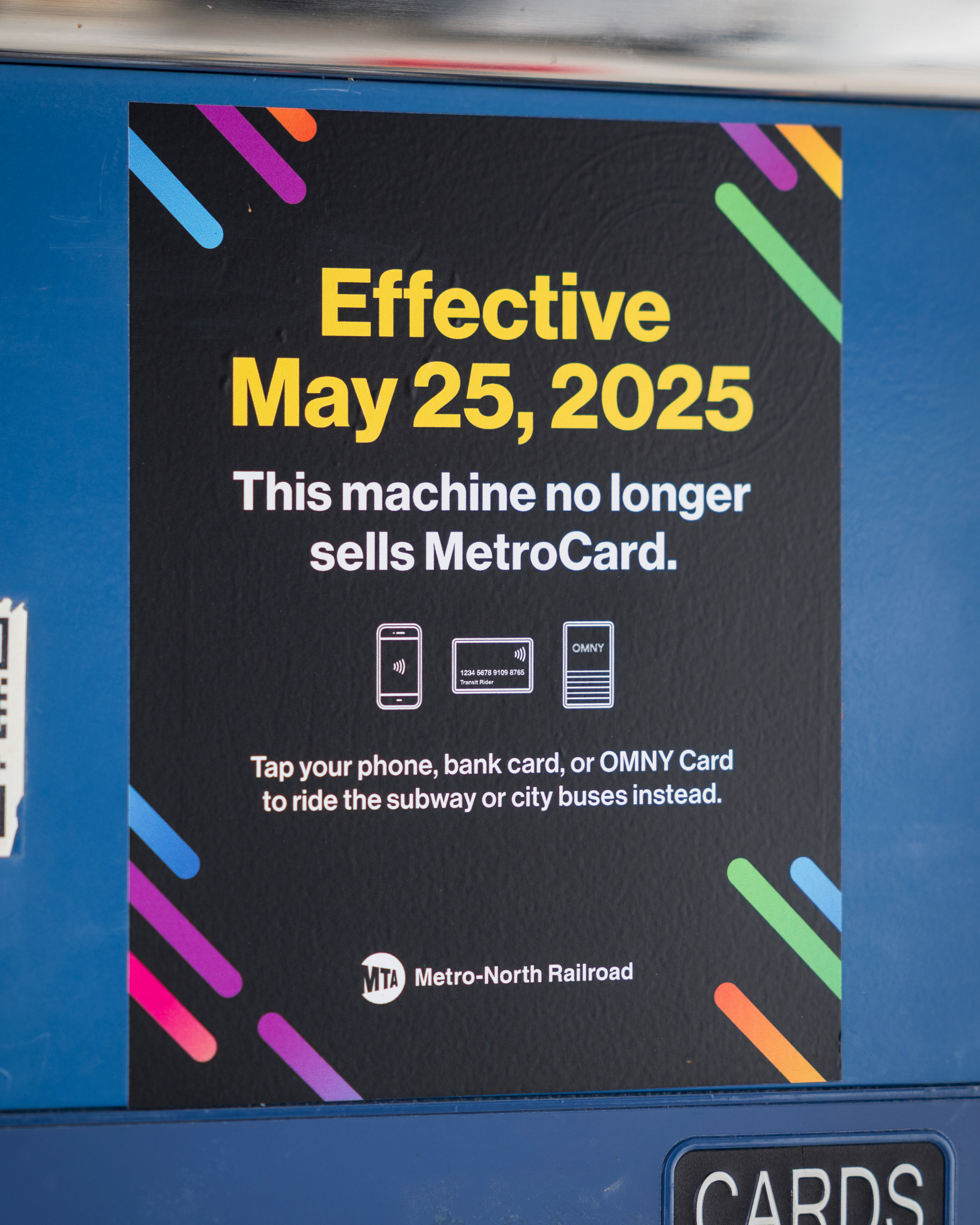
Informational notice on a ticket vending machine announcing the end of MetroCard sales

With the MetroCard being phased out, the vending machines were also removed from stations. In April 2025, the Court Square–23rd Street station, 21st Street–Queensbridge station, and Jackson Heights–Roosevelt Avenue/74th Street station became the first three stations in the New York City Subway system to have all their MetroCard vending machines removed. As of December 2025, the last subway stations to have MetroCard Machines are Bedford Park Boulevard-Lehman College, Woodlawn, Pelham Bay Park, and Wakefield-241 Street.

=== MetroCard bus and van ===
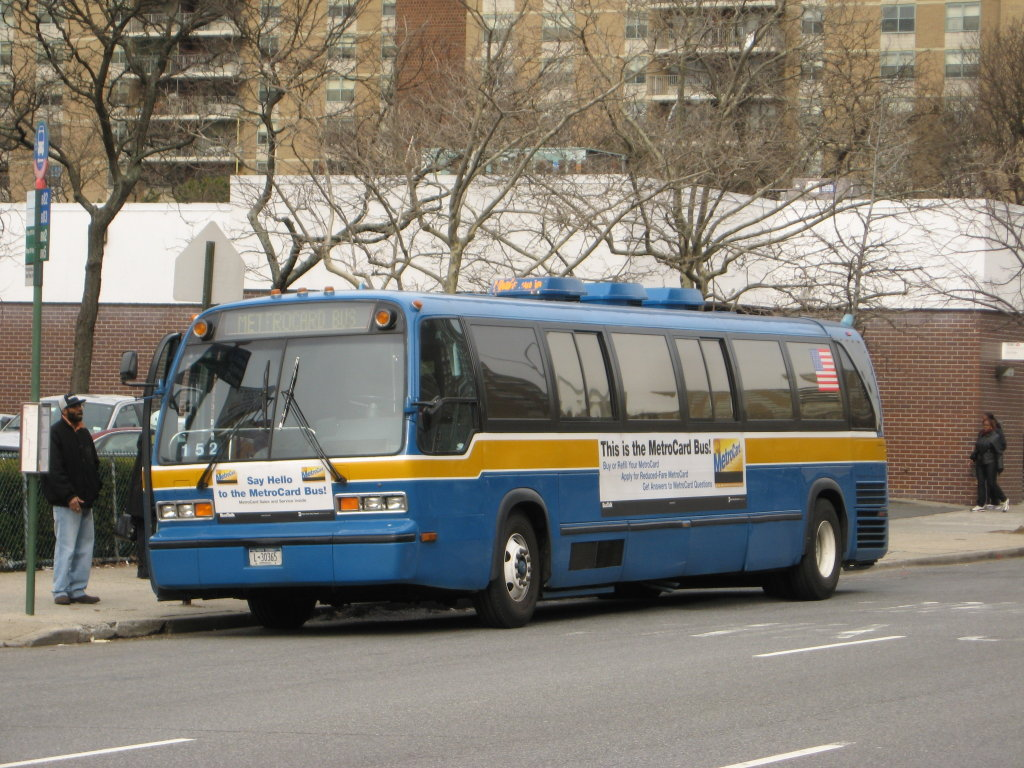
MetroCard bus

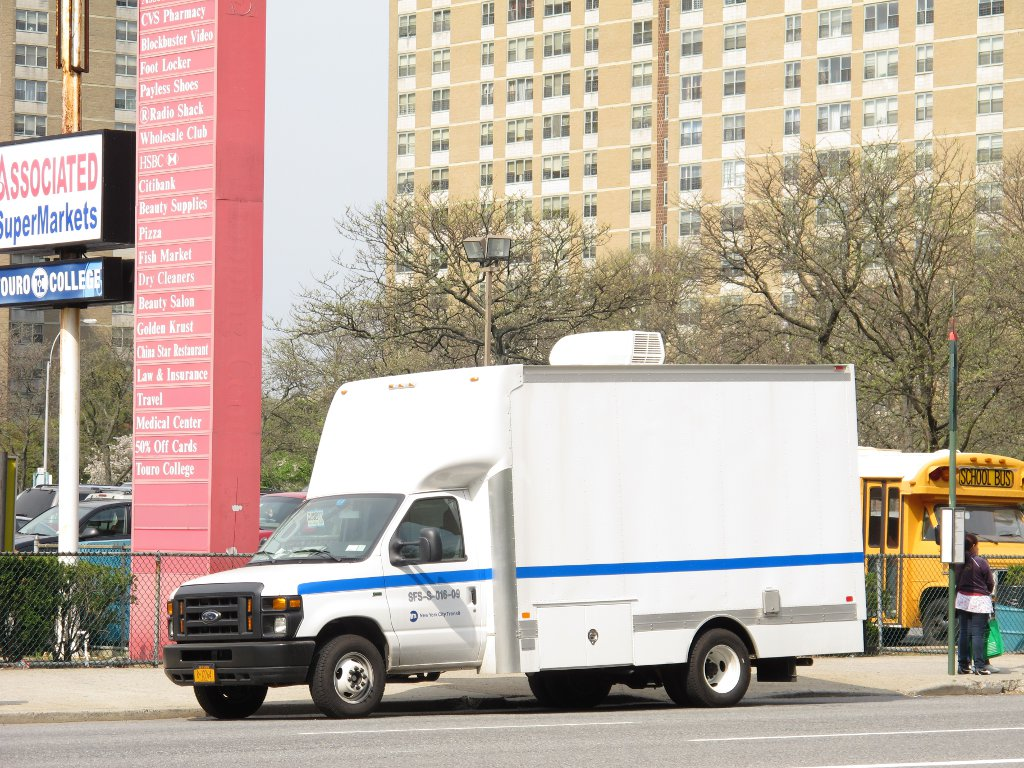
MetroCard sales van

A number of MetroCard sales vans and a MetroCard bus (a retired bus converted for sales duty) routinely travel to specific locations in New York City and Westchester County, stopping for a day (or half a day) at the announced locations. MetroCards can be purchased or refilled directly from these vehicles. Reduced-fare MetroCard applications can also be processed on the bus, including taking photographs for these cards.

The MetroCard van serves all five boroughs and Westchester County, while the MetroCard bus serves Manhattan, the Bronx, Queens, and parts of Brooklyn.

=== Neighborhood MetroCard merchants ===
Vendors can apply to sell MTA fare media at their business. Only presealed, prevalued cards are available, and no fee is charged. A comprehensive listing of neighborhood MetroCard merchants can be found on the MTA website.

=== Commuter railroad ticket vending machines ===
Ticket vending machines (TVMs) for the MTA's two commuter railroad systems, Long Island Rail Road and Metro-North Railroad, offer the option to purchase combined tickets/passes and MetroCards. A $5.50 MetroCard is available with a round-trip ticket, and a $50 MetroCard is available with a monthly pass. In addition, the machines sell separate $25 MetroCards. TVMs at Jamaica station and Penn Station sell AirTrain JFK monthly passes on the back of LIRR tickets. All cards sold from these machines are of thick paper stock, not the normal plastic. As of May 25, 2025 Ticket Vending Machines have stopped selling MetroCards.

Beginning in 2007, with the start of the S89 bus service, a combined Hudson–Bergen Light Rail (HBLR) monthly pass and monthly MetroCard became available at NJ Transit ticket vending machines at HBLR stations.

== Unauthorized resale and scams ==
The MetroCard system is susceptible to various types of unauthorized resale, colloquially known as "selling swipes".

At times, this may involve individuals charging to swipe another commuter into the subway system at a discount below the official fare, either by using an "unlimited ride" MetroCard, or by manipulating a spent MetroCard to obtain an extra, unpaid ride. A 2004 press release from New York State Senator Martin J. Golden claims these behaviors cost the MTA $260,000 a year.

So-called 'swipers' reportedly may secure customers by maliciously damaging the coin and bill acceptor mechanisms of MetroCard vending machines. Nearly half of broken vending machines were in Manhattan, and the MTA spent $26.5 million on MVM repairs as of 2017. An 18-minute delay between uses of an "unlimited ride" MetroCard at any given station, and the expense of unlimited ride MetroCards, have historically limited their use for selling swipes.

More commonly, "swipers" use a technique which involves bending a spent MetroCard in a precise way that then allows a further use of that MetroCard when swiped and unkinked according to a specific procedure at a turnstile. Swipers employ this procedure to sell discount entry to the subway; some riders simply use the technique to garner free subway entry themselves. The bend purportedly damages the magnetic stripe on the MetroCard which indicates it no longer has value, prompting the turnstile reader to defer to a back-up field which indicates that the MetroCard has one remaining fare. When the technique was discovered, it could be performed an unlimited number of times with the same MetroCard. However, a software correction soon limited the technique to just once per used MetroCard, in which a turnstile computer which had deferred to that "backup" field would require the MetroCard be swiped additional times through the reader/writer before granting entry so any lingering indication of value could be deleted from the card, making it impossible to manipulate a given MetroCard in the same way once again.

Criminal charges leveled against those using this bent-MetroCard technique have included petit larceny and, in a state law introduced specifically to target swipers in the year 2006, with "unauthorized sale of transportation services." As early as 2001, however, police and prosecutors began to charge people bending MetroCards to seek free rides (either to sell, or for personal use) with various forms of forgery.

While misdemeanor forgery charges have been used in a number of jurisdictions, the Manhattan District Attorney's Office championed felony forgery charges for those in possession of manipulated metrocards, including "criminal possession of a 'forged instrument' in the 2nd Degree", a felony. A representative of that office successfully defended the charge to the state's highest court, the New York State Court of Appeals, in a case decided in 2009. Critics have argued, however, that the court's decision is based on an incomplete—and possibly incorrect—understanding of MetroCard technology, calling to question the status of a bent metrocard as a "forged instrument". The MetroCard technology has no public documentation, and has never been made available to criminal defendants who might dispute claims that a simple bend to a MetroCard alters its data as read by a turnstile computer in the way claimed by Manhattan prosecutors. It is unclear, for example, why a bent MetroCard cannot be used to obtain an unpaid ride on a New York City bus if simply bending a MetroCard can actually alter how it is read by a subway turnstile computer as prosecutors claim. One researcher has argued that a bent MetroCard must be subject to further procedures in order to be seen by the turnstile computer as legitimate, which requires both concealing data from the turnstile computer with a bend, as well as having fresh data written to the MetroCard by the turnstile computer itself. Because a bent MetroCard will not actually appear legitimate to a turnstile computer without further steps to allow the turnstile computer to write that fresh data, this casts doubt on the claim that a bent MetroCard—often cited as evidence in the prosecutions of swipers—actually constitutes a "forged instrument" as defined in New York State law.

A $1 fee on new MetroCards imposed in 2013 significantly curtailed the bent-MetroCard form of selling swipes. The fee motivated riders to keep and refill their existing MetroCards, undermining the vast supply of discarded spent MetroCards from which swipers previously drew as their stock-in-trade. Nonetheless, people continue to sell swipes of bent MetroCards which have been discarded. Swipers continue to be prosecuted under forgery laws, according to research published in 2019.

The MetroCard has resisted digital duplication through software. The MetroCard has a magnetic stripe, but both the track offsets and the encoding differ from standard Magstripe cards. The card's data is in a proprietary format developed by the contractor Cubic. Off-the-shelf reader/writers for standard cards are useless to read from or write to MetroCards without mechanical modification and custom software. Self-identified hackers have had success decoding MetroCard data by treating MetroCard contents as sound, and converting its contents to binary using a computer sound card, inferring the role of data fields by comparing MetroCards with known properties, and developing custom Linux software to decode MetroCard data. Moreover, MetroCard data has been duplicated to other media, also by treating it as sound, using an eight-track tape player. While duplicates may be usable to enter the subway in the short term, they are likely to be invalidated after the AFC database discovers imbalance between fares purchased for a MetroCard with a certain serial number, and fares used from one or more MetroCards bearing that same serial number.

== Limited editions ==
Over the years, the MTA has issued limited-edition MetroCards in honor of certain events, people, or structures. There were over 400 limited-issue designs issued throughout the MetroCard's history.

=== Back side designs ===
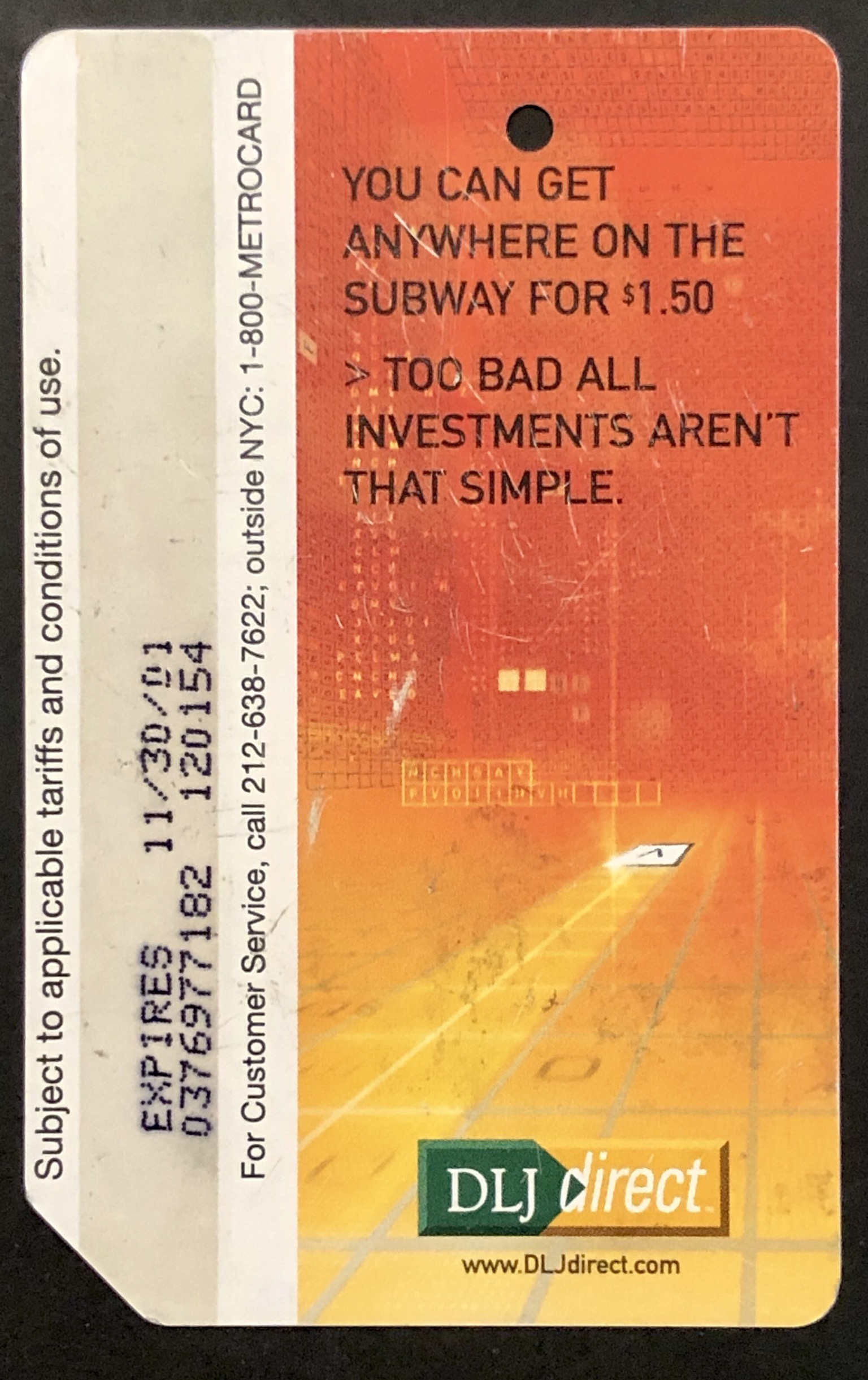
2001 MetroCard with corporate advertisement on reverse

For much of the MetroCard's history, images were printed only on the back side of MetroCards. These have included cards with the Statue of Liberty, the New York City bid for the 2012 Summer Olympics, a Solomon R. Guggenheim Museum exhibit, and the Circle Line ferry. Sporting events have also been commemorated, including the Subway Series, the 2014 Super Bowl, the 1994 New York Rangers Stanley Cup Finals victory, and the 2014–15 season of the Brooklyn Nets.

In 2017, the MTA started issuing Supreme-branded MetroCards at eight subway stations. The Supreme-branded cards were popular, and there were reports that some were resold for hundreds of dollars. The MTA issued MetroCards featuring Mariska Hargitay, the main actress in the TV series Law & Order: Special Victims Unit, in 2024 to celebrate the show's 25th anniversary.

=== Front side designs ===
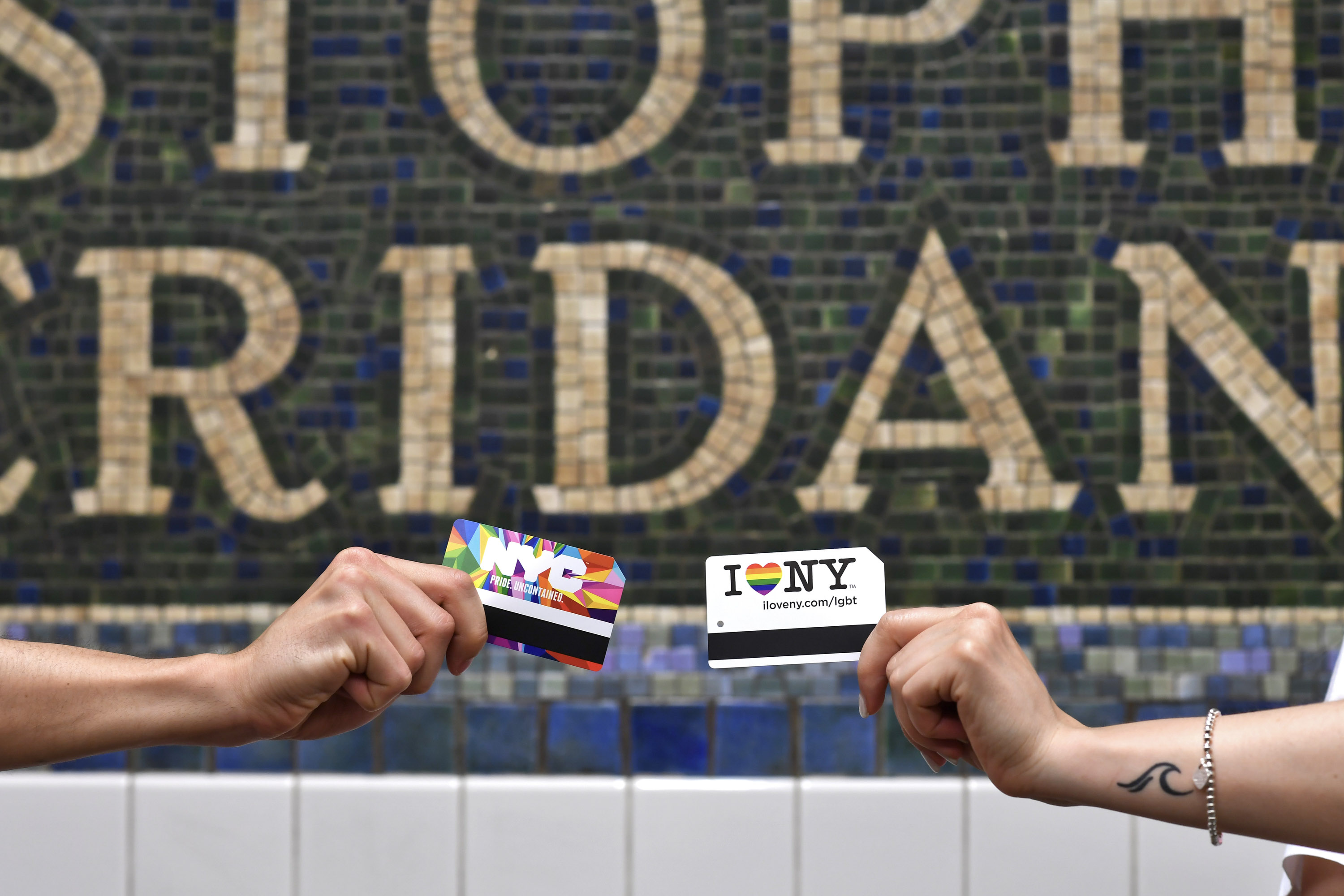
LGBT pride-themed MetroCards for Stonewall 50 - WorldPride NYC 2019

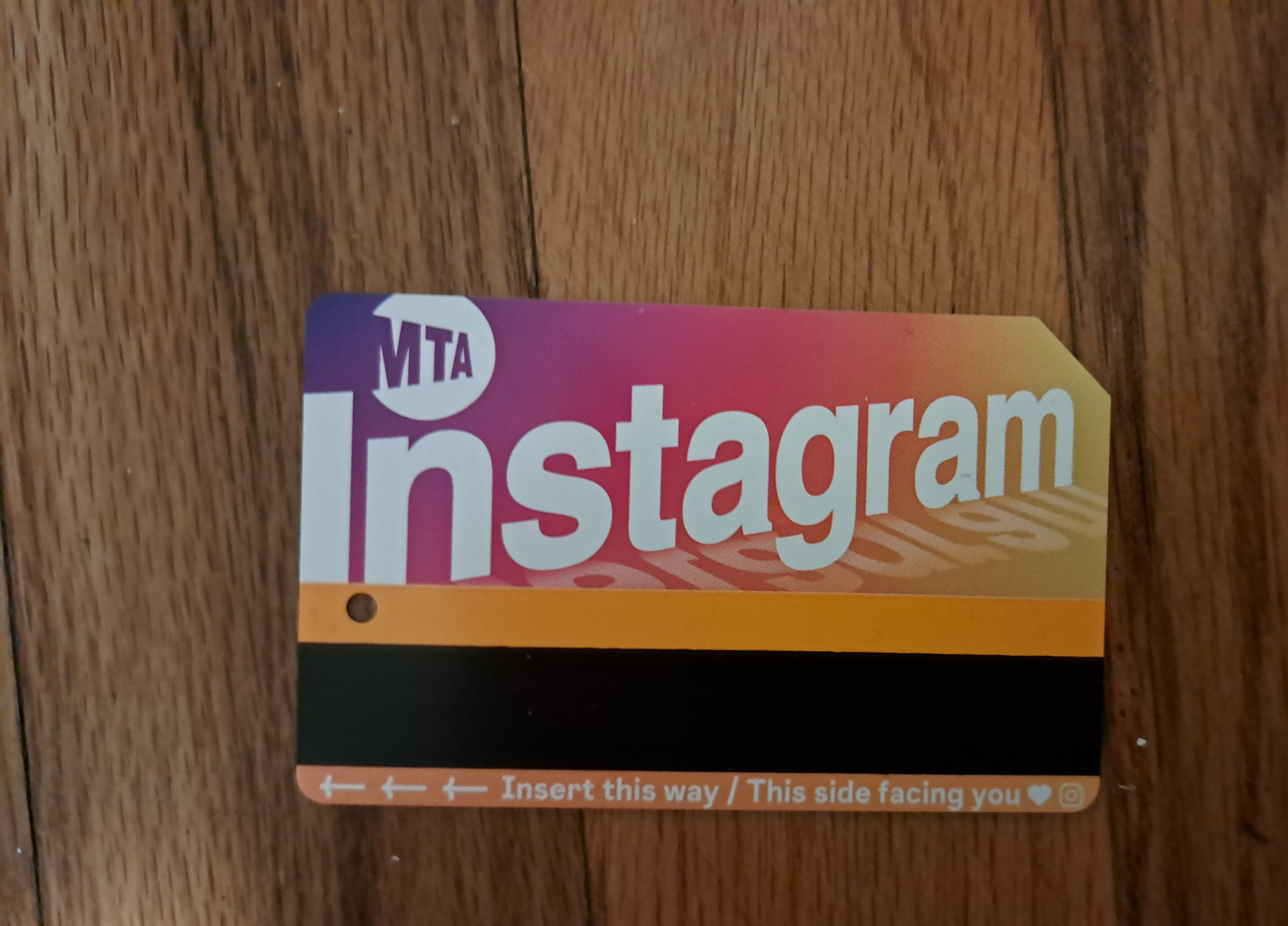
An Instagram MetroCard, the final limited-edition design produced by the MTA

The MTA started allowing front side advertising on MetroCards in 2012. One of the earliest front side designs was an I Love New York card first sold in October 2013. 300,000 cards were printed in remembrance of Hurricane Sandy the previous year.

Starting in December 2018, the MTA issued 250,000 Game of Thrones-themed MetroCards at Grand Central–42nd Street, in honor of the show's final season. The cards came in four designs. Starting in May 2019, coinciding with the opening of the Memorial Glade at the National September 11 Memorial & Museum, the MTA issued 250,000 MetroCards with images of first responders at the World Trade Center site after the September 11 attacks. The MetroCards were issued at ten subway stations: six in Lower Manhattan and four high-traffic stations in Midtown Manhattan and Brooklyn. In June 2019, the MTA celebrated Stonewall 50 - WorldPride NYC 2019 with LGBT pride-themed MetroCards.

In November 2020, the MTA celebrated Veterans Day with Veterans Day themed MetroCards. The MetroCards were available at six stations: two in Brooklyn, one in Queens, two in Midtown Manhattan, and one in The Bronx. In 2023, the MTA issued special Cam'ron, LL Cool J, Rakim, and Pop Smoke MetroCards. In 2024, the MTA issued Ice Spice MetroCards to celebrate the launch of Ice Spice's first album. That May, the MTA announced that two final front-side MetroCard designs would be issued, as the MTA was in the process of retiring the MetroCard itself. The second-to-last commemorative card was themed to Olivia Rodrigo and was sold starting in October 2024. The last promotional Metrocard, collaborating with Instagram, features social media stars "New York Nico", "SubwayTakes" and "Overheard NY" were sold starting on December 9, 2024.
