= Thomas A. McKean =

American autistic author and lecturer (born 1965)

- Born: June 18, 1965 (age 61); Columbus, Ohio, United States
- Education: Parkland College
- Writing career
- Language: English
- Notable works: Soon Will Come the Light, Light on the Horizon
- Notable awards: National Autism Society of America award for literary excellence
- Website: thomasamckean.com

Thomas A. McKean is an American autistic author and lecturer. He is a poet, a singer-songwriter, an international speaker and a writer. He is the author of Soon Will Come the Light: A View From Inside the Autism Puzzle and Light On the Horizon: A Deeper View From Inside the Autism Puzzle. McKean has claimed that he did not speak until he was 16, but was able to describe how autism was like to him. He constantly fights various symptoms such as making strange noises, and says that perception of the senses causes low-intensity pain. McKean at one time earned a living traveling about and doing conferences and consulting work on autism. He has been described as having the unusual ability to be in the world of autism, yet also possesses the communication skills to describe what that world is like.

== History ==
McKean claimed that he was never given a formal diagnosis growing up, so he was often punished, even though he knew there was something wrong with him. He spent the first half of his elementary school career in a regular classroom, then was in special-education classrooms until the sixth grade. He also claimed to be unpopular in school, and dreaded gym and recess. McKean then spent three years in a psychiatric institution starting at age 14. However, he was eventually elected to the board of the Autism Society of America in 1992. He started his advocacy career after discovering that he was on the spectrum, through attending Autism Society of America chapter meetings and receiving attention for being able to talk about his own experiences as an autistic person.

Thomas McKean was a guest on The Oprah Winfrey Show in 2001. On the show, he said that he was lonely as a child, had to learn emotions, and said that his sensitivity to certain sensations and colors was exaggerated. McKean also discussed aspects of his autism in Esquire magazine, in a section dedicated to unusual experiences.

== Analysis ==
In Soon Will Come the Light: A View From Inside the Autism Puzzle, a winner of the Autism Society of America's Literary Achievement Award, he described the years that he faced confusion around his disorder. He also claimed to have talents in fields such as computers and technical design, in addition to his passion for writing. Janis M. Serak, a member of the Autism Society of America, Board of Directors, reviewed the book in The Advocate, the Autism Society of America's newsletter in 1994. Serak claimed that few books had been written by autistics, and that this book could be useful to parents of autistic children for its first-person portrayal of autism. Overall, he wrote that McKean had sought to understand himself better through writing.

== Views on Autism and Neurodiversity ==
McKean believes that autism professionals need to listen more carefully to parents, and be more verbally direct about the child's difficulties. He also insists that parents and professionals should keep up on current research.

McKean once wrote an article for The Advocate about his experiences with auditory integration training for autism, claiming that it gave him mixed results. He says that it is important to ask professionals in this field about the reliability of their methods and claims.

At one point, McKean gave a first-person account about dating with autism, where various issues were discussed. He was dating a woman named Theresa who also had two autistic children, who also wrote part of the account. Theresa wrote about how his sensory issues caused difficulty with intimacy. McKean also said it was difficult to know how to understand and discipline her children. Nonetheless, they said that they wanted to put the effort into creating a strong relationship.

McKean has stated that some people who claim to have autism on the internet portray a very distorted and unrealistic view of what autism really is. He has described the politics of autism as a distraction from the therapies and support needed to treat those who have it. In his 2006 essay A Danger in Speaking that McKean questions autistic speakers that have been self-diagnosed. Critics say that this ignores the obstacles and stigma that some autistics face in getting diagnosed.

== Bibliography ==
- Soon Will Come the Light: A View from Inside the Autism Puzzle (1994, Future Horizons, Inc.; reissued 2001, Future Horizons, Inc.)
- Light on the Horizon: A Deeper View from Inside the Autism Puzzle (1996, Future Horizons, Inc.)
