= Cubic Corporation =

American public transportation and defense corporation

- Type: Private
- Industry: Public transport and defense
- Founded: 1949
- Founder: Walter J. Zable
- Headquarters: San Diego, California, U.S.
- Key people: Stevan Slijepcevic (president, CEO)
- Owner: Veritas Capital; Elliott Management
- Number of employees: 6,200 (2020)
- Divisions: Cubic Mission and Performance Solutions; Cubic Transportation Systems
- Website: www.cubic.com

Cubic Corporation is an American multinational defense and public transportation equipment manufacturer. The company was founded by Walter J. Zable in 1949 and was a publicly traded company from 1951 to 2021. It operates two business segments: Cubic Transportation Systems (CTS) and Cubic Mission and Performance Solutions (CMPS).

== History ==
Cubic Corporation was founded in 1949 by Walter J. Zable as an electronics company in San Diego, California, and began operations in 1951. Zable devised the company name as he wanted the name to reflect both engineering and precision. Its first product was a calorimetric wattmeter, a device used for measuring microwave output. It became a publicly-traded company in 1959.

In 1969, the company acquired United States Elevator Corporation, a maker of freight and passenger elevators.

Cubic employs 6,200 people globally. Stevan Slijepcevic was named president and chief executive officer of Cubic Corporation in January 2022.

In May 2021, Cubic announced the completion of its sale to the private equity firms Veritas Capital and Elliott Management, turning the publicly traded New York Stock Exchange company into a privately held company.

On 4 March 2025, the People's Republic of China announced sanctions on 10 U.S. military-industrial companies, including Cubic, for participating in arms sales to Taiwan.

== Company divisions ==
Cubic's operating segments include:

- Cubic Mission and Performance Solutions provides networked command, control, communications, computers, intelligence, surveillance and reconnaissance (C4ISR) capabilities for defense, intelligence, security and commercial missions, as well as realistic combat training systems, secure communications, operations, maintenance, technical and other support services for the U.S. and allied nations.
- Cubic Defence New Zealand Ltd (previously OSCMAR International Limited) is a manufacturer of training and simulations systems for military forces worldwide. It is based in Auckland, New Zealand, and owned by Cubic Corporation.
- Cubic Transportation Systems designs, integrates, and provides outsourced business process and information technology services for automated fare collection systems for public transit operations. Additionally, this segment provides the fare payment infrastructure, including gates, ticket machines, and smart card readers, and the back end or central system for processing and reporting revenue and other data. Services include customer support, software support, and operations services. CTS is the world's largest operator of public transport fare collection services. Founded May 5, 1972.

== Products and services ==
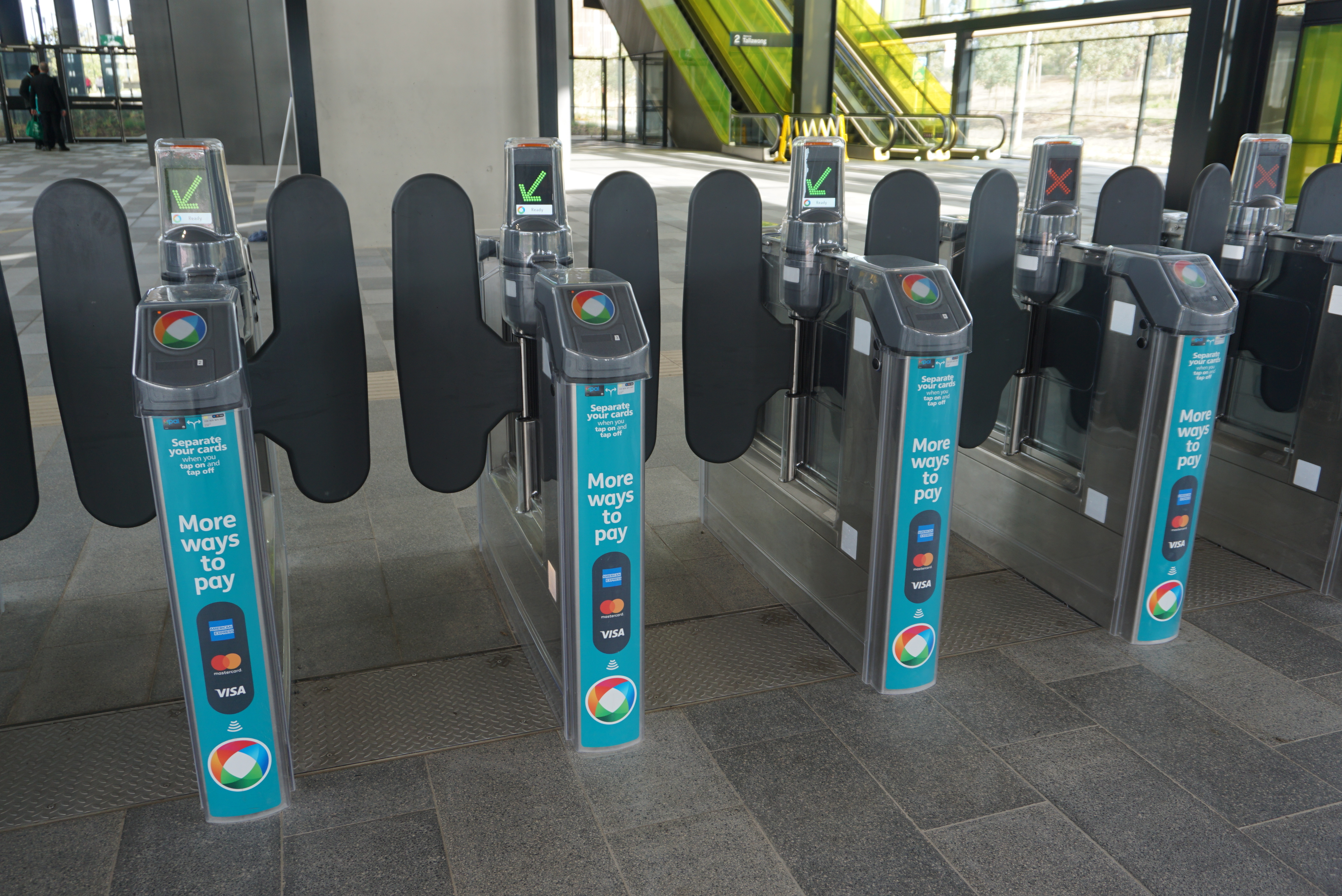
Cubic smartcard gates on Sydney Metro

Cubic Transportation Systems provides the following products and services:

- Ticket machines
- Smartcard readers
- Fare-collection gates
- Full-service mobility platform
  - Umo is a multi-modal platform that connects public and private mobility systems to optimize public transportation operations.
  - Umo keeps riders moving efficiently by offering multi-modal journey planning, contactless payments, real-time travel information, and loyalty rewards through the Umo Mobility App.
- Revenue management back office and associated services
  - Card-based
  - Account-based: New York's OMNY, Chicago's Ventra system (used by CTA, Pace and Metra), Brisbane's GO card system, and London Oyster Cards are some of Cubic's account-based products.
  - Mobile: Cubic has deployed mobile applications in multiple locations in the United States and was the first to launch transit cards within the mobile wallet.
- Transit customer support
- Management services to transit agencies
- Real-time passenger information
- Operational planning assistance
- Traffic management
  - Customers in the UK include the Highways Agency, Transport for London, and Transport Scotland. Cubic also works for Transport for New South Wales in Australia through the Intelligent Congestion Management Program (ICMP), which focuses on enhanced monitoring and management of the area's road network.
- Predictive analytics
- Tolling
  - Cubic created an integrated platform for payment processing, customer service, and financial management for the tolling industry.
- Operational IT services
- Asset management services
  - Services include field maintenance, device support, depot repair and part supply, spares and obsolescence, and cash collection.
- GRIDSMART
  - In 2019, CTS acquired GRIDSMART for approximately $87 million in cash.
  - GRIDSMART specializes in video detection at the intersection using advanced image processing, computer vision modeling and machine learning along with a single camera – providing data for optimizing the flow of people, bicycles, and traffic through intersections.
  - GRIDSMART has approximately 12,000 operating intersections.
- Trafficware
  - In 2018, CTS acquired Advanced Traffic Solutions Inc. ("Trafficware") for approximately $235.7 million in cash.

== Projects ==
Cubic Transportation Systems has delivered over 400 projects in 40 markets spanning five continents. Cubic first implemented mobile ticketing technology in 2006 and produces multiple mobile fare collection options, including mobile ticketing through barcoding, NFC tools, contact and contactless smartcard payments, and traditional automated fare collection systems. The Umo Mobility Platform was launched in January 2021. Cubic Transportation Systems manages around 70% of the global market for smart transit cards. Cubic processes more than 24 billion transactions a year.

In 2017, Cubic was selected by the Massachusetts Bay Transportation Authority (MBTA) to implement the AFC 2.0 project to update the MBTA's fare collection systems. This project was budgeted for $723 million, with a planned completion date of May 2021. As of May 2021, the cost of the project (now called "Fare Transformation") had risen to $935 million, with an updated completion date of 2024. In February 2023, the MBTA announced that it considered the project "unlikely to meet the current 2024 timeline for full implementation".

In June 2023, Cubic wrote a letter to the Australian Victorian state premier, requesting a review of the tender process which awarded the state upgrade of its Myki system to its competitor Conduent. In its letter, Cubic claimed its submitted bid was $100,000,000 less than the winning bid, and that procurement officers from the state government had not visited its operational sites. Cubic's preference for installing its own ticket readers was cited as a reason to consider its bid more expensive.

On October 21, 2022, it was announced that NZ Transport Agency Waka Kotahi had signed a contract with Cubic to develop its National Ticketing Solution, Motu Move. The National Ticketing Solution will allow the use of a single fare card on public transport across the whole of New Zealand.

In January 2026, Bay Area transit officials criticized Cubic Transportation Systems for a severely flawed December 2025 rollout of Clipper 2.0, describing it as a "hot mess" and "colossal screw-up" due to persistent glitches like account access failures, payment errors, system timeouts, and overwhelmed customer service, prompting demands for urgent fixes.

Fare Collection Projects
Date	Project	Location
1993	MetroCard	New York metropolitan area
1997	Skånetrafiken public transportation authority, JoJo card (phased out in December 2019)	Skåne County
1997	Chicago Transit Authority Transit Card (phased out in 2014)	Chicago
1999	WMATA SmarTrip	Washington metropolitan area
2002	ChicagoCard	Chicago
2002	TransLink FareSavers (replaced by Compass card in 2016, fully phased out in 2019)	Vancouver
2003	Oyster card	London
2004	BART EZ Rider	San Francisco Bay Area
2005	Go-To card	Minneapolis
2006	RMV / KVV Mobile Ticketing	Frankfurt Rhine-Main
2006	MARTA Breeze Card	Atlanta metropolitan area
2007	PATCO Freedom Card	Philadelphia and South Jersey
2007	PATH SmartLink	New York metropolitan area
2008	go card	South East Queensland
2008	TAP card	Los Angeles County
2009		Modena
2009	Easy Card	Miami metropolitan area
2009	Compass Card	San Diego County
2010	MTA CharmCard	Maryland
2010		Scania
2010	Clipper card	San Francisco Bay Area
2011	PATCO Open Payment Pilot including Google Wallet acceptance	Philadelphia and South Jersey
2012	London Future Ticketing agreement	London
2012	Opal card	New South Wales
2013	Ventra Card	Chicago
2013	Compass Card	Vancouver
2018	Next Generation Ticketing System	Queensland
2019	OMNY	New York
2021	Umo Mobility Platform	Valley Regional Transit (Boise)
2021	Umo Pass	Rogue Valley Transportation District (RVTD)
2022	Umo Mobility Platform	Milwaukee County Transit
2022	Umo Mobility Platform	BC Transit (Canada)
2024 (estimated)	Tapp	Port Authority Trans-Hudson (PATH)
2024 (initial rollout)	Motu Move	New Zealand
2024 (estimated)	AFC 2.0/Fare Transformation	Massachusetts Bay Transit Authority

== Other units ==
- DTECH Labs provides communications products for military, government, first responders, and civilian customers.
- TeraLogics is a provider of real-time Full Motion Video Processing Exploitation and Dissemination for the Department of Defense, the intelligence community, and commercial customers based in Ashburn, Virginia.
- GATR Technologies manufactures portable, inflatable SATCOM and C4ISR terminals for tactical communications in harsh and forward or remote deployed environments.
- Vocality provides embedded technology that unifies communication platforms enabling its business, government, and military customers to communicate securely using legacy systems with the latest wireless and cellular networks.
- PIXIA Corp. is an imagery management company.
