= Thomas McKean (artist) =

American artist

Thomas McKean is an American, New York City based artist and children's book author, known for his MetroCard art.

== Life and Career ==
McKean was born in New York City. His father was a commercial artist and portrait painter and his mother was a photographer and illustrator. He is a descendant of American politician and Founding Father, Thomas McKean.

A self-proclaimed sustainable artist, McKean began repurposing MetroCards into art in the early 2000s. "They’re an amazing material," McKean said in a 2023 interview, "they’re ecologically indestructible." He also creates art from objects he finds outside his East Village apartment; where he has lived since the 1980s.

McKean has had exhibitions of his work at Fish Eddy, the Garment District Alliance, the Ground Floor Gallery in Brooklyn, New York, the Augusta Savage Gallery in Amherst, Massachusetts, and has created art for such magazines as Bon Appétit and Time Out.

In November 2022, the MTA announced that they would be discontinuing the use of MetroCards by 2024. "I've been doing this for twenty-something years," McKean said, "when the time is up, the time is up."

== Published works ==
- McKean, Thomas (January 1, 1986). Vampire Vacation. Camelot Publishing. ISBN 978-0380898084.
- McKean, Thomas (May 1, 1993). The Haunted Circus. Simon & Schuster. ISBN 978-0671729981.
- McKean, Thomas (April 12, 1994). Hooray for Grandma Jo. Alfred A. Knopf. ISBN 978-0-517-57842-1.
- McKean, Thomas (January 1, 1998). My Evil Twin. Camelot Publishing. ISBN 978-0380790821.
