= Free public transport =

Public transport not funded by fares from passengers

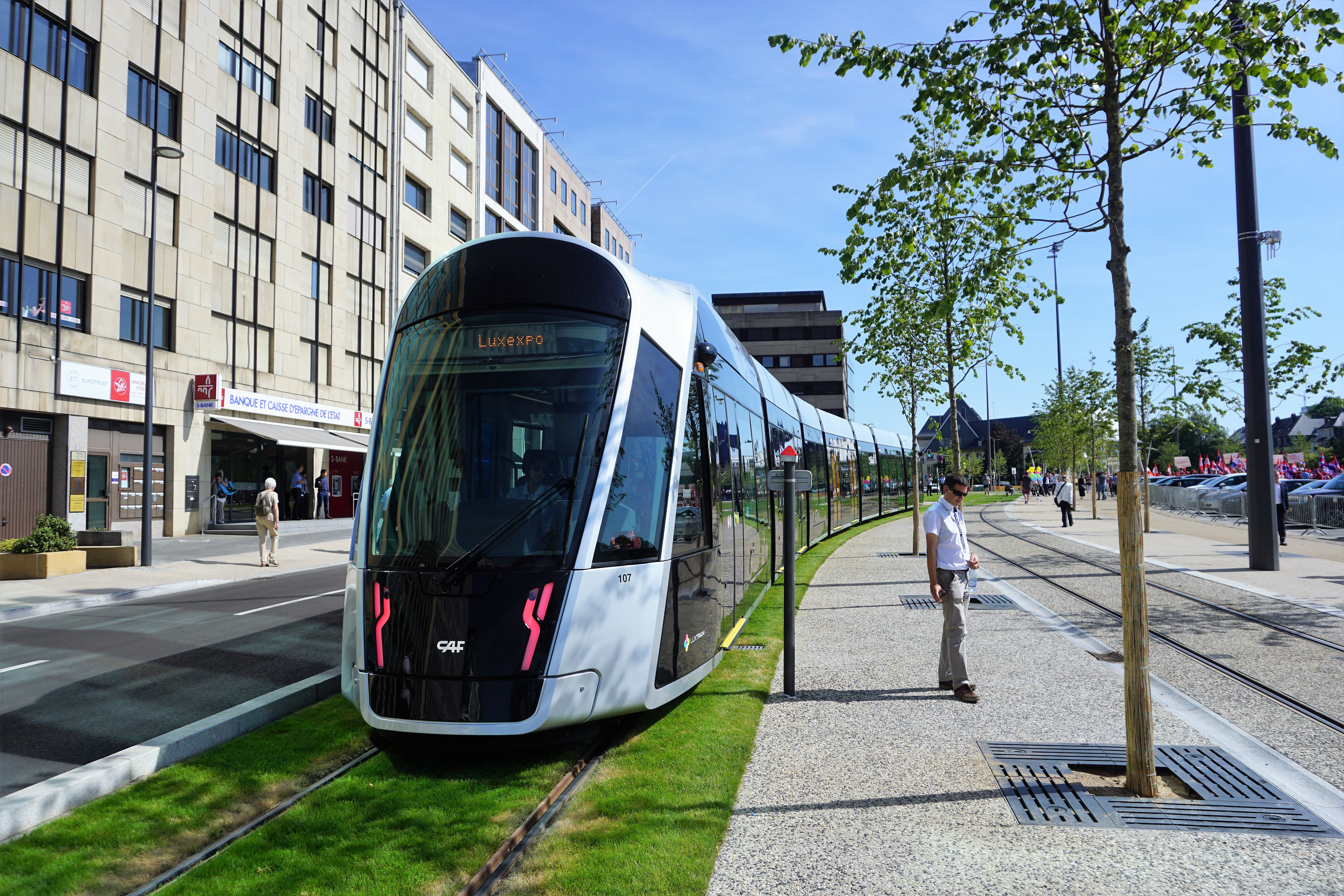
In 2020, Luxembourg became the first country to provide free public transport across its entire territory.

Free public transport, often called fare-free public transit or zero-fare public transport, is public transport which is fully funded by means other than collecting fares from passengers. It may be funded by national, regional or local government through taxation, and/or by commercial sponsorship by businesses. Alternatively, the concept of "free-ness" may take other forms, such as no-fare access via a card which may or may not be paid for in its entirety by the user.

On 29 February 2020, Luxembourg became the first country in the world to make all public transport in the country (buses, trams, and trains) free to use. On 1 October 2022, Malta made its public transport free on most routes, though unlike in Luxembourg, this applies only to residents.

As some transit lines intended to operate with fares initially start service, the organisation may elect not to collect fares for an introductory period to create interest or to test operations.

== Types ==
=== City-wide systems ===
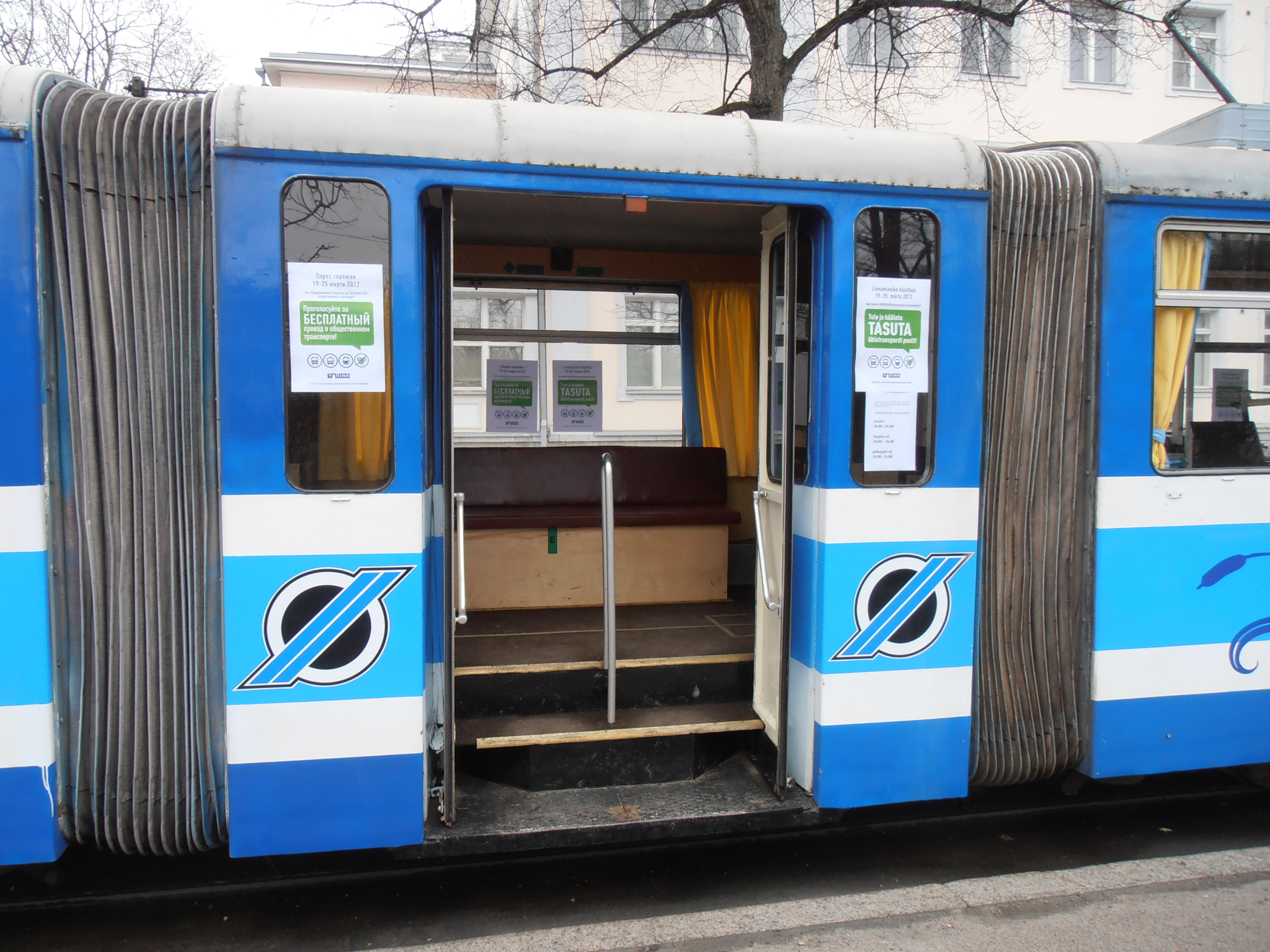
Tallinn's residents voted for free public transportation on 24 March 2012. This polling place was in a historic tramway Gotha G4-61.

Several mid-size European cities and many smaller towns around the world have converted their public transportation networks to zero-fare. The city of Hasselt in Belgium is a notable example: fares were abolished in 1997 and ridership was as much as "13 times higher" by 2006. Tallinn, the capital city of Estonia with more than 420,000 inhabitants, switched to free public transport in 2013 after a public vote.

In the U.S. state of Washington, 14 rural transit systems have adopted zero-fare policies, either permanently or through pilots in the 2020s. Fares for passengers aged 18 and younger have been free on most local and inter-city transit systems in the state since September 2022. The program was part of a larger statewide transportation package and also includes inter-city Amtrak trains, as well as the Washington State Ferries system.

Kharkiv in Ukraine is the largest city in the world with free public transport with a population of 1,420,000 residents, where free public transport for everyone has been introduced in 2022.

Since 2025, local transport in Belgrade, a city with 1,380,000 inhabitants, has been free.

=== Local services ===
In July 2017, Dubai announced it would offer free bus services for a short period of time on selected days.

In the northwestern United States, some tribal governments offer free bus service on their respective reservations, including on the Muckleshoot, Spokane, Umatilla and Yakama Indian Reservations.

=== Emergency relief ===
During natural disasters, pandemics, and other area-wide emergencies, some transit agencies offer zero-fare transport.

==== United States ====
Sonoma–Marin Area Rail Transit commuter rail temporarily offered free service for those needing transportation alternatives during the 2017 Tubbs Fire and 2019 Kincade Fire.

Some agencies, including the Central Ohio Transit Authority and King County Metro, offer free public transport during snow emergencies to reduce the number of vehicles on the street.

==== COVID-19 pandemic ====
During the COVID-19 pandemic, several agencies paused the collection of fares to alleviate concerns that the virus could be transmitted on surfaces, to keep travelers from coming into close contact with employees, or to allow rear door boarding on their vehicles. These agencies are mostly located in smaller cities where the farebox recovery ratio is low as they could afford to implement this policy without a major hit to revenue. A study was conducted to detail the ways that fare collection during the pandemic varied geographically and demographically. During this time, 63.5% of the 263 public transit agencies studied had suspended fare collection. Geographically, the alleviation of fares was common around urban centers (such as San Francisco, Los Angeles, Seattle, New York City, etc.).

==== Statewide ====
In March 2026, the Australian states of Victoria and Tasmania announced they would both be making public transport free for a limited time as an incentive not to drive due to the escalation in fuel prices resulting from the war in the Middle East. In Victoria public transport was free throughout April and May 2026, and Tasmania has made public transport free from 30 March 2026 to the end of June 2026.

== Benefits ==
=== Operational benefits ===
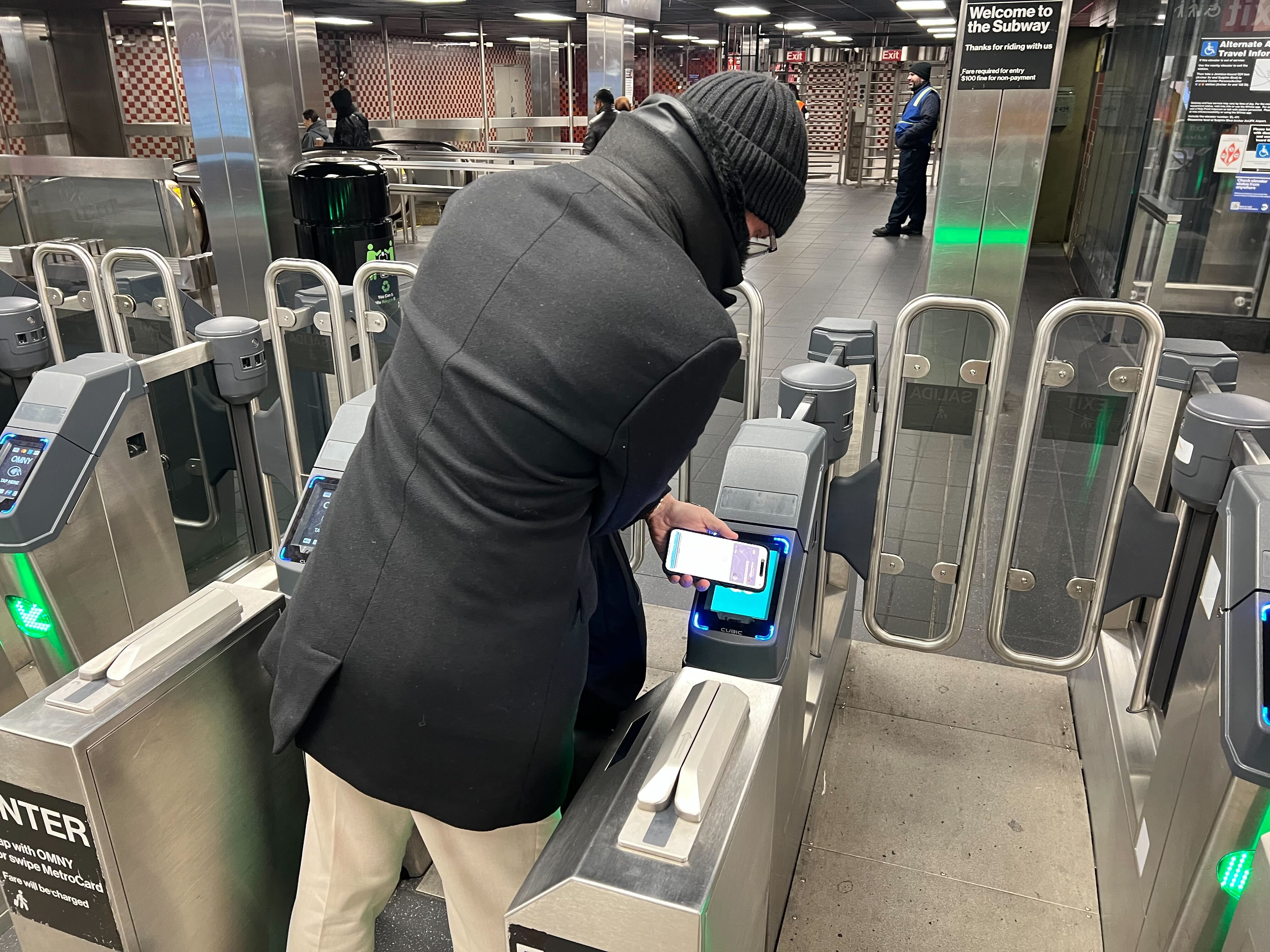
These fare gates in New York City cost $700,000 to install, one of the equipment costs that would become unnecessary with fare-free transit.

Transport operators can benefit from faster boarding and shorter dwell times, allowing faster timetabling of services. Although some of these benefits can be achieved in other ways, such as off-vehicle ticket sales and modern types of electronic fare collection, zero-fare transport avoids equipment and personnel costs.

Passenger aggression may be reduced. In 2008 bus drivers of Société des Transports Automobiles (STA) in Essonne held strikes demanding zero-fare transport for this reason. They claim that 90% of the aggression is related to refusal to pay the fare.

A randomized controlled trial conducted in Santiago, Chile, found that access to fare-free public transport increased overall travel by 12%, particularly boosting off-peak travel by 23% due to a rise in both public transport and non-motorized trips.

=== Commercial benefits ===
Some zero-fare transport services are funded by private businesses, such as the merchants in a shopping mall, in the hope that doing so will increase sales or other revenue from increased foot traffic or ease of travel. Employers often operate free shuttles as a benefit to their employees, or as part of a congestion-mitigation agreement with a local government.

=== Community benefits ===
Zero-fare transport can make the system more accessible and fair for low-income residents. Other benefits are the same as those attributed to public transport generally:

- Road traffic can benefit from decreased congestion and faster average road speeds, fewer traffic accidents, easier parking, savings from reduced wear and tear on roads
- Increased public access, especially for the poor and low waged, which can in turn benefit social integration, businesses and those looking for work
- Environmental and public health benefits including decreased air pollution and noise pollution from road traffic

Research findings from Stroud & Bekhit (2023) about inclusivity gaps in FFPT research studies Research of fare-free public transport (FFTP) studies by Stroud and Bekhit (2025) reveals that only 25% of the studies significantly consider non-dominant groups of the population in their research, with extensive knowledge gaps about FFPT impacts on marginalized communities.

=== Global benefits ===
Global benefits of zero-fare transport are also the same as those attributed to public transport generally. If use of personal cars is discouraged, zero-fare public transport could mitigate the problems of global warming and oil depletion. On average, cars emit one pound of CO_{2} per mile driven (280 g/km). Public transport helps to reduce the number of vehicles being driven which results in decreasing carbon emissions. Cars are also responsible for emitting other pollutants such as antifreeze.

== Countries with countrywide zero-fare transport ==
- Estonia wants to become entirely zero-fare. Counties in Estonia are allowed to make public transport free. Between 2018 and 2024, buses were free of charge in 11 of Estonia's 15 counties. Public transport in Estonia's capital, Tallinn, has been free to local residents since 2013. As of January 2024, free local transport in the counties was largely abolished, but remains available for people up to 19 years of age and those aged 63 and over.
- Since March 2024, the Hungarian national railway company MÁV does not charge those of ages 65 and over and 14 and under for transportation. Buses of the company Volánbusz can also be used free of charge from people of these same age ranges.
- In the Ireland public transportation for citizens over the age 66 is free. People with disabilities and carers aged under 66 may also be eligible for free travel
- Luxembourg was the first country to offer free public transport (trams, trains, and buses) for everyone across the entire country. Since 29 February 2020, all public transport has been free in the country, with the exception of the first class on trains.
- Malta became fare free for all residents on 1 October 2022.
- In the Netherlands, students with Dutch citizenship get free public transportation country-wide in trains, trams, buses and metro. Students who are studying at universities of applied sciences and universities need to finish their degree ten years after starting it or they will need to pay back the amount of money.
- Romania has made public transportation including buses, subways and inter-country trains free for all pre-university students. However university students only have the option for a 50% discount on individual inter-country train tickets or inter-city subscriptions.
- Throughout Spain, from 1 September 2022 to 30 June 2025, as a way to reduce gas prices for trucks after the Russian war in Ukraine, all multi-trip ticket train journeys on commuter services and medium-distance routes (less than 300 kilometres (190 mi)) were made free of charge, on the condition that the individual uses it at least an average of once a week.
- There are UK-wide provisions for free bus travel for senior citizens (60-years-old and over in Scotland, Wales, Northern Ireland and Greater London, state pension age for England). The Scottish government has also implemented free bus travel across the country for people under 22-years-old since 31 January 2022, while the Scottish National Blind Person Scheme allows free rail and ferry travel for blind persons. The senior citizens bus pass also apply to rail and rapid transit (the Tube) in Greater London, Wales, and Northern Ireland.

Country	Population	Operator	Operated	Duration	Notes
Gibraltar	29,500	state	May 2011–now	15.55 years	Only for residents and workers; visitors must pay.
Ireland	5,149,139	state	1967–now	59 years	Everyone aged 66 and over, living permanently in Ireland gets access to free travel on all public transportation.

== List of towns and cities with area-wide zero-fare transport ==
=== Americas ===
==== Brazil ====
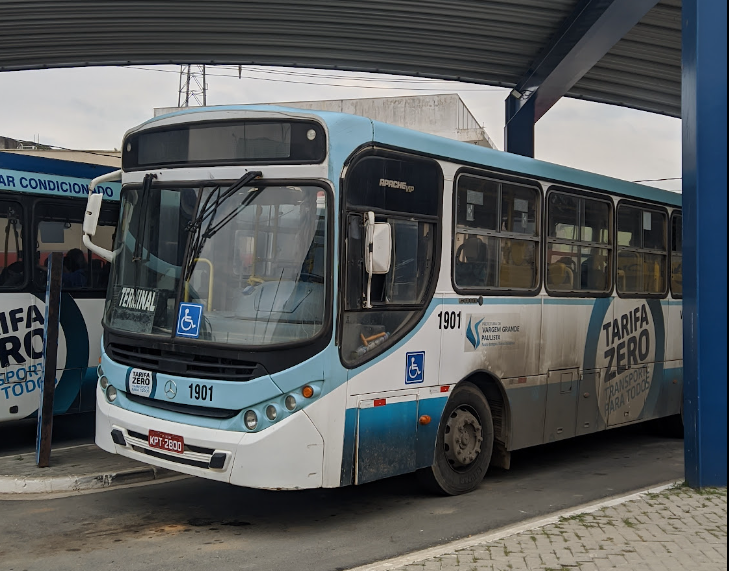
A bus with free public transport in Vargem Grande Paulista, Brazil

State	Town/City	Population	Operator	First year	Duration	Notes
Minas Gerais	Muzambinho	21,975	local government	2011	since 2011	
Paraná	Ivaiporã	31,812	local government	2011	since 2011	
Paraná	Pitanga	32,645	local government	2012	since 2012	
Rio de Janeiro	Porto Real	16,574	local government	2011	since 2011	
Rio de Janeiro	Maricá	146,549	Empresa Pública de Transportes – EPT	2014	since 2014	
Rio de Janeiro	Silva Jardim	21,307	local government	2014	since 2014-02-15	
São Paulo	Agudos	36,700	local government	2011	since 2011	
São Paulo	Potirendaba	15,449	local government	1998	since 1998	
São Paulo	Paulínia	86,800	local government	2013	since 2013	
São Paulo	Vargem Grande Paulista	48,720		2019	since 2019	

==== Canada ====
Province	Town/City	Population	Operator	First Year	Duration	Notes
Alberta	Canmore	13,000	ROAM	2019		
Alberta	Cold Lake	15,000	Cold Lake Transit			
Ontario	Orangeville	30,700	Orangeville Transit	2023		
Quebec	Candiac	21,000		2014		
Quebec	La Prairie	23,000		2014		
Quebec	Mont Tremblant	10,000	Mont-Tremblant Public Transit	2019		
Quebec	Sainte-Julie	30,000		2014		
Quebec	Saint-Philippe	5,500		2014		

==== United States ====
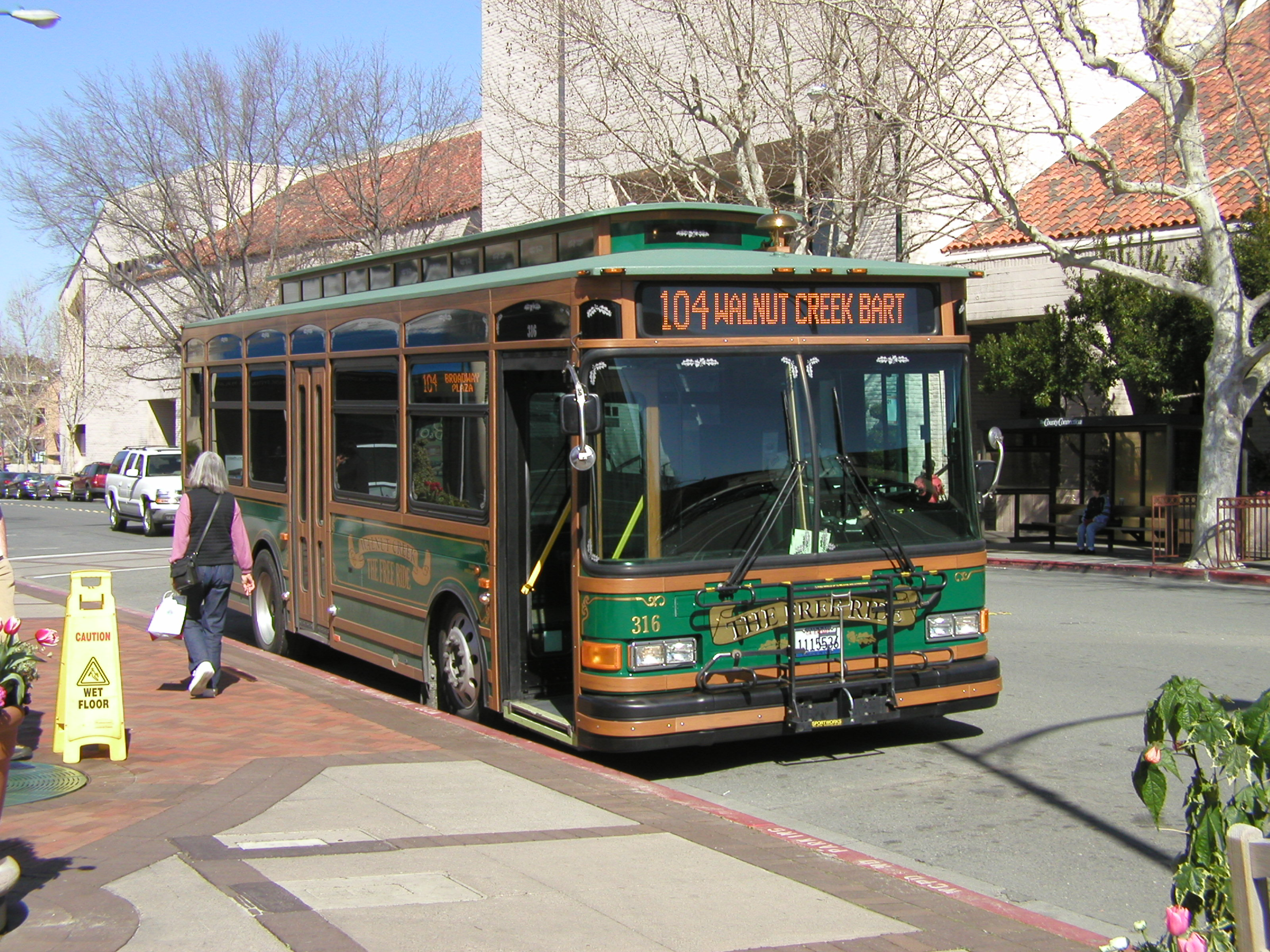
A free Gillig Trolley Replica bus in Walnut Creek, California in 2006

Town/City	Population	Service/operator	First year	Duration	Notes
Albuquerque, New Mexico	564,559	ABQ RIDE	2022		
Alexandria, Virginia	159,467	DASH (bus)	2021		
Athens, Georgia	126,913	Athens Transit	2021		
Athens, Ohio	23,849	Athens Public Transit			through April 2027
Avon, Colorado	6,115	Avon/Beaver Creek Transit	2021		
Blacksburg, Virginia	44,826	Blacksburg Transit	2020.	since 2020	BT halted the collection of fares in 2020 due to the COVID-19 pandemic. In 2022, the Blacksburg Town Council voted unanimously to stick with the status quo and permanently approved a fare-free system.
Boone, North Carolina	17,122	AppalCart	1981	since 1981	combination of funding from the town, Appalachian State University, Watauga County, and state and federal agencies.
Boston, Massachusetts	675,647	several MBTA key bus routes (23, 28, and 29)	2021	2021 until December 2026	Main article: Free public transport in Boston
Breckenridge, Colorado	4,901	Free Ride Transit System	1997		
Butler County, Ohio	390,357	Butler County Regional Transit Authority			
Cache Valley, Utah		Cache Valley Transit District	2000	since 2000	
Canby, Oregon	15,829	Canby Area Transit			
Cape Cod, Massachusetts		Cape Cod Regional Transit Authority	2025	since 2025	
Chadron, Nebraska	5,488	City of Chadron			
Chapel Hill, Carrboro, and UNC-Chapel Hill, North Carolina	70,000+	Chapel Hill Transit	2002	since 2002	operated by the Town of Chapel Hill to serve Chapel Hill, Carrboro, and UNC-Chapel Hill; supported by taxpayers and University fee-payers
Clallam County, Washington	77,805	Clallam Transit	2024		Does not apply to long-distance routes and Hurricane Ridge shuttle
Clemson, South Carolina	11,939	Clemson Area Transit			partnership between Clemson University and surrounding communities
Clovis, California	120,124		2025	since 2025	New service launched in late 2025
Columbia, Missouri	126,254	Go COMO	2020	since 2020	
Commerce, California	41,000	City of Commerce Municipal Bus Lines	1962	since 1962	all transportation services are free of charge
Coral Gables, Florida	42,871				
Corvallis, Oregon	54,462	Corvallis Transit System	2011	since February 2011	
Dayton, Ohio	137,644	Flyer Shuttle Bus operated by the Greater Dayton Regional Transit Authority	2018	since 2018	Shuttle connects downtown Dayton and University of Dayton
Detroit, Michigan	639,000	Q Line operated by the Detroit Transport Authority	2017	since 2017	Connecting northern suburbs to central Detroit
Detroit, Michigan	639,000	Detroit People Mover	2024	since 2024	Sponsored pilot project.
Ellensburg, Washington	20,326	Central Transit			
El Paso County, Texas	865,657	El Paso Transportation Authority	2025	until 2026	
Fairfax, Virginia	24,276	CUE Bus	2020		CUE stopped collecting fares in response to the COVID-19 pandemic and has since continued operating zero-fare. Funded in part by the Fairfax, Virginia and a grant from the Virginia Department of Rail and Public Transportation.
Fort Collins, Colorado	169,810	Transfort	2020		Transfort stopped collecting fares in response to the COVID-19 pandemic and has since continued operating zero-fare. As of January 2023, the city is considering keeping Transfort fare-free permanently.
Frederick County, Maryland	302,883	TransIT	2026	since 2026	
Gallatin County, Montana	118,960	Streamline			
Grant County, Washington		Grant Transit Authority	2020		Became permanently fare-free in 2022.
Island County, Washington	81,054	Island Transit	1987	since 1987	
Hawaii County, Hawaii	206,315	Hele-On Bus	2021	through 2028	
Iowa City, Iowa	74,828	Iowa City Transit	2023	through 2026	
Jefferson County, Washington		Jefferson Transit	2024	since January 2024	
Ketchum/Sun Valley, Idaho	3,003	Mountain Rides			
Kootenai County, Idaho		Citylink			
Laramie, Wyoming	31,407	University of Wyoming Transit System			
Las Cruces, New Mexico	111,385	RoadRUNNER Transit	2022	since 2022	
Lawrence, Kansas	94,934	Lawrence Transit	2023	since 2023	
Lebanon, New Hampshire	13,151	Advance Transit			combination of state and federal funding and from Dartmouth-Hitchcock Medical Center and Dartmouth College. Also serves Hanover and White River Junction, Vermont
Logan, Utah	49,534	Cache Valley Transit District	1992	since 1992	
Macomb, Illinois	20,000	Go West Transit	2006	since 2006	
Milwaukee, Wisconsin	560,000	Transdev	2018	since 2018	Hop streetcar services provided free through various sponsorships starting in 2018
Mammoth Lakes, California	8,234	Eastern Sierra Transit Authority			
Marion, Indiana	29,948	Marion Area Transit System	2008	since 2008	
Martin County, Florida	158,431	Martin County Public Transit	2025	since 2025	
Mason County, Washington	61,019	Mason Transit Authority	1992		Fares charged on intra-county routes
Memphis, Tennessee	633,104	Memphis Area Transit Authority	2025	since 2025	Pilot program
Missoula, Montana	69,122	Missoula Urban Transportation District			
Montgomery County, Maryland	1,082,273	Ride On	2019		2019: under 18, July 2025: all riders
Moscow, Idaho	25,146	SMART Transit			
Mountain View, California	81,500	Google and City of Mountain View			Mountain View Community Shuttle, electric bus service 10AM to 6PM daily
Muckleshoot Indian Reservation, Washington		Muckleshoot Indian Tribe			
New York City, New York	16,692,900	MTA Regional Bus Operations – Q70 bus	2022	since May 2022	The Q70 bus route has been permanently fare-free since May 2022. The Q4, B60, Bx18, M116 and S46/96 temporarily became fare-free 24 September 2023, but fares were reinstated 31 August 2024.
New York City, New York	16,692,900	Roosevelt Island Red Bus	2014	since April 2014	
New York City, New York	16,692,900	Staten Island Ferry (NYCDOT)	1997	since July 1997	
Norman, Oklahoma	128,026	EMBARK	2023	since 2023	
North Liberty, Iowa	20,479	North Liberty Transit	2026	since 2026	
Ogden, Utah/Salt Lake County, Utah		Utah Transit Authority	2018	since 2018	OGX and MVX bus routes only. UVX was previously fare-free from 2018 to 2024.
Olympia/Thurston County, Washington	252,264	Intercity Transit	2020	2020–2027	5-year pilot, later extended to 2027
Oxford, Mississippi	25,416	Oxford-University Transit			
Park City, Utah	8,300	Park City Transit, High Valley Transit			Also serves Snyderville Basin
Placer County, California	404,739	Tahoe Truckee Area Regional Transit	2019	since 2019	through December 2027
Radford, Virginia	16,070	Radford Transit			
Richmond, Virginia	226,610	Greater Richmond Transit Company	2020	through 2027	
Rome, Georgia	37,746	Rome Transit Department (RTD)	2021	until 29 December 2023 (planned)	Beginning on 4 October 2021, the City of Rome Transit Department began offering free Fixed-Route Transit Service in response to the COVID-19 pandemic. The fare adjustment is currently set to expire on 29 December 2023.
Sandy, Oregon	9,570	Sandy Area Metro	2000	since 2000	
Spokane Indian Reservation, Washington		Spokane Tribe of Indians			
Stanford, California	13,809	Stanford Marguerite Shuttle			
Starkville, Mississippi	23,888	Starkville-MSU Area Rapid Transit			
Tacoma, Washington	216,279	Sound Transit T Line	2003	2023	Eliminated after extension
Tampa, Florida	380,000	TECO Line Streetcar	2018		Service with fares started in 2002, free since 2018.
Terre Haute, Indiana	58,389	Terre Haute Transit	2025	since 2025	
Tucson, Arizona	1,043,433	Sun Tran	2020		Fare free for the entire Tucson Metropolitan Area since Spring 2020. Originally a pandemic-era temporary measure, it is now permanent.
Umatilla Indian Reservation, Oregon		Confederated Tribes of the Umatilla Indian Reservation			
University of Michigan, Ann Arbor, Michigan	120,000	University of Michigan Transit Services			
University of Minnesota, Twin Cities, Minnesota	51,853	U of M Transitway	1992	since 1992	
Vail, Colorado	4,589				over 20 hours of service every day during winter
Vero Beach, Florida	15,220	GoLine			free 14-route public transit system serves 700,000 annual riders
Walla Walla, Washington	50,600	Valley Transit	1981		Until 2026
Westchester County	1,004,457	Bee-Line Bus System	2022		June 1 through September 5 (Labor Day)
Wilmington, Vermont	2,225	Deerfield Valley Transit Association	1996	since 1996	free 13-route public transit system operated by Southeast Vermont Transit serving 200,000 riders annually and providing commuter bus service between Bennington and Brattleboro. Operates as "the MOOver".
Wilsonville, Oregon	19,509	South Metro Area Regional Transit			
Worcester, Massachusetts	206,518	Worcester Regional Transit Authority	2020	since 2020	All buses fare-free
Yakama Indian Reservation, Washington		Confederated Tribes and Bands of the Yakama Nation			
Yamhill County, Oregon	107,722	Yamhill County Transit	2020	since 2020	
Irvine, California	307,670	City of Irvine	2024	since 2024	operated by local municipal government, beginning as a one-year pilot

=== Asia ===
Country	Town/City	Population	Operator	Begin operation	Duration	Notes
India	Karnataka	14,800,000 (7,075,577 women)	state government			free non-AC bus services for women
India	New Delhi	20,000,000 (9,000,000 women)	state government	2019		free bus services for women
India	Tamil Nadu	72,147,030 (36,009,055 women)	state government	2021		free metro and bus services for women
Indonesia	Jakarta	10,770,487	TransJakarta	2016; 10 years ago		Three free city tour buses and all Mikrotrans feeder routes
Iran	Tehran	9,840,100	City council	2026		Metro and Rapid bus routes temporarily declared free to deal with cost-of-living crisis during the 2026 Iran war. There are proposals to make this change permeanent
Israel	Tel Aviv	1,350,000	Na'im Busofash	22 November 2019		Free weekend service from six authorities in Gush Dan–Givatayim, Kiryat Ono, Ramat HaSharon, Tel Aviv-Yafo, Yehud-Monosson and Shoham.
Israel	Tiberias	41,300	city council	2019		one bus route that operates on Saturdays
Malaysia	Kuala Lumpur	1,790,000	SKS Bus	31 August 2012; 14 years ago		Go KL City Bus
Russia	Cheremushki, Khakassia	9,000	Dam staff			zero fare is official to anybody (de jure service line because the taxes would be higher than revenues)
South Korea	Hwaseong	934,441	city	2020		Fare-free bus service for children, youths and elderly
Thailand	Bangkok	8,249,000	multiple			In some bus lines in older non-airconditioned bus (fare prices are also about age/equipment of bus). Also occasionally for several months for new public metro lines.
Turkey	Ovacık	6,998	municipality	2014		All municipality-operated buses are free
Turkey	Tunceli	38,429	municipality	2019		Free in three neighbourhoods that do not have privately-operated public buses

=== Europe ===
Country	Town/City	Population	Operator	Operated	Duration	Notes
Belgium	Duffel	17,385	De Lijn			Only valid for one ride
Belgium	Hasselt	72,000	De Lijn	1 July 1997–now	29.38 years	1,300% ridership increase 1996–2006. In 2013, Hasselt stopped free bus service for adults; riders under 19 still travel for free.
Belgium	Ingelmunster	10,928	De Lijn	2017–now	9 years	Free public transport was offered when the construction of a new bridge made the connection between the two sides of the town impossible.
Belgium	Mons	92,000	TEC Hainaut	1999-2016	17 years	2 intramuros lines were free
Belgium	Namur	115,000	TEC Namur-Luxembourg	2024–now	2 years	1 circle route in city centre
Bulgaria	Samokov	27,000		2006-now	20 years	
Bulgaria	Stamboliyski	12,000	municipality	2019–now	7 years	
Czech Republic	Frýdek-Místek	58,200	ČSAD Frýdek-Místek a. s.	27 March 2011–now	15.65 years	Only 365-day chip coupon (however the chip card costs 299 Kč and prolongation 1 Kč) and user must to not be a debtor toward the city. Number of passengers has increased from 3.8 million in 2010 to 5.7 million in 2013. Since 2014, it is possible to travel free on regional bus lines to next 18 villages and towns. Population in the serviced area is 100,000. Chip card for free public transport has 25,000 passengers.
Czech Republic	Hořovice	6,800	Probo Trans Beroun s. r. o.	March 2008–now	18.72 years	City transport has only one bus line (no. 210009 alias C09 or C9)
Czech Republic	Kolín	33,289	Okresní autobusová doprava Kolín, s.r.o.	1 January 2023	3.88 years	
Czech Republic	Litoměřice	24,000	BusLine a. s., renamed to TD BUS a.s.	1 May 2018–now	8.55 years	Two bus lines
Czech Republic	Lovosice	8,700	BusLine a. s., renamed to TD BUS a.s.	28 January 2018–now	8.8 years	The only bus line no. 558001.
Czech Republic	Prague	1,285,000	Dopravní podnik hl. m. Prahy and other operators			Between 2002 and 2008–2015 (ca) and 25 August 2002, during the Vltava flood and flooding of the Prague metro system. Also always during time of the smog or other emergency (used rarely – 1996–1997 for two day, 1992–1993 for four days).
Czech Republic	Přelouč	9,000	Veolia Transport Východní Čechy a. s.	1 December 2009–6 March 2010	96 days	Initial price at the newly established first city bus line (no. 665101)
Czech Republic	Říčany	12,400	ČSAD Benešov a. s. (ICOM group)	3 September 2018–now	8.21 years	3 intervallic lines (yellow, red and blue) and 3 school lines (Š1, Š2, Š3), licence numbers 289001–289006, in working days only. Previous lines of Prague Integrated Transport remain paid.
Czech Republic	Strakonice	22,900	ČSAD STTRANS a. s.	1 January 2018–now	8.88 years	In 2017, the city bus transport was free for senior citizens, children and students up to 26 years; since 2018, buses are free for all, but only in the city zone (sections outside the city are still paid).
Czech Republic	Třeboň	8,700	ČSAD Jindřichův Hradec a. s.	2002 and 2007–2008		Under Mayor Jiří Houdek (KDU-ČSL), city transport has only one bus line (No 340300), influenced by US school buses
Czech Republic	Valašské Meziříčí	27,300	ČSAD Vsetín a. s.	14 June 2009–14 July 2009; September 2017–now	1 month; 9.21 years	City transport has five bus lines
Denmark	Ærø	5,948	municipality			Free wifi, you can bring your bike, dogs are allowed
Denmark	Læsø	1,759	municipality			Free electric bus, with a small fee if you bring a bicycle or stroller
Denmark	Morsø	19,734	municipality	2009–now	17 years	Free public bus transportation for everyone on the busses within the municipality; It was decided, because mostly school students used busses which the municipality covered
Estonia	Keila	9,873		February 2013–now	13.79 years	
Estonia	Tallinn	435,245		1 January 2013–now	13.88 years	Tallinn is currently the largest city offering free public transport for its residents. Regional buses are excluded from the scheme. Elron commuter trains are also free inside the city limits. Tallinn is also the first capital with free public transport for its residents.
Estonia	Türi	6,174				
Faroe Islands	Tórshavn	20,000	Tórshavn City Council			Six different bus lines
France	Aubagne	42,900 (100,000 in service area)		15 May 2009–now	17.51 years	The Aubagne tramway is considered to be the first completely fare-free tram system in the world.
France	Bar-le-Duc	15,700		1 September 2008–now	18.21 years	
France	Boulogne-Billancourt	110,000		1992–now	34 years	
France	Cahors	20,447	Raynal Voyages	2 November 2019–now	7.04 years	
France	Castres	62,500		October 2008–now	18.13 years	
France	Châteauroux	47,127		2001–now	25 years	
France	Colomiers	28,538		1971–now	55 years	The first area of France to offer zero-fare public transport which is still in operation at present
France	Compiègne	40,028		1975–now	51 years	
France	Dunkirk	91,000	municipality	2015: free weekend service, fall 2018: full service	11 years	
France	Figeac	9,900		2003–2009	6 years	
France	Issoudun	13,500		1989–now	37 years	Has free in the name of the service (Transport Issoudun Gratuit). Works on certain days of the week in the afternoons only.
France	Libourne	23,000		1 January 2009–now for under 18s; 28 August 2010 for all	17.88 years	
France	Manosque	22,200		1 January 2010–now	16.88 years	
France	Niort	122 000	Communauté d'agglomération du Niortais	1 September 2017–now	9.21 years	
France	Vitré	15,313		spring 2001–now	25 years	First French urban agglomeration to do so.
Germany	Augsburg	295,135	SWA	1 January 2020–now	6.88 years	Free public transport within a zone downtown called "City-Zone"
Germany	Erlangen	116,562	ESTW	1 January 2024–now	2.88 years	Free use of all buses in the inner city for everybody
Germany	Kelheim	122,258	VLK	November 2021–now	5.05 years	Free buses since November 2021 within Kelheim County
Germany	Langenfeld	60,926				Free use of all buses and the lightrail lines S6 and S68 in the city areas of Monheim am Rhein, Langenfeld (Rheinland) and Düsseldorf-Hellerhof, for residents of Monheim am Rhein only
Germany	Lübben	14,500				No longer offered; influenced by Hasselt
Germany	Monheim am Rhein	46,072				Free use of all buses and the lightrail lines S6 and S68 in the city areas of Monheim am Rhein, Langenfeld (Rheinland) and Düsseldorf-Hellerhof, for residents of Monheim am Rhein only
Germany	Templin	16,500				No longer offered
Greece	Ilioupoli	78,153	municipality			Free transportation to all, but only local buses, for specifically only local municipality buses.
Iceland	Akureyri	18,803		1 January 2007–now	19.88 years	
Italy	Catania	315,000	AMT, Metropolitana di Catania, Università degli Studi di Catania	10 April 2018–now	8.61 years	Free metro and bus lines to all local university students
Netherlands	Netherlands		government	1991–now	35 years	Free public transport for students Studentenreisproduct or OV-studentenkaart in the whole Netherlands. Students can choose for free transport on weekdays and 40% discount in the weekends, or vice versa.
Norway	Stavanger	146,011	municipality	2023–now	3 years	
Poland	Bełchatów	56,973	Miejski Zakład Komunikacji Sp. z o.o.	28 May 2015–now	11.48 years	Free for all users.
Poland	Żory	62,625		1 May 2014–now	12.55 years	Free for all users.
Poland	Lubin	72,951		1 September 2014–now	12.21 years	Free for all users.
Poland	Olkusz	36,122		1 September 2013–31 December 2014	16 months	For car owners registered in this municipality only.
Poland	Ostrołęka	52,337		28 October 2017–now	9.06 years	Free for all users.
Poland	Starachowice	43,883		1 April 2022–now	4.63 years	For residents and tax payers in this municipality (and their minor family members).
Poland	Gorzów Wielkopolski	114,567	Miejski Zakład Komunikacji w Gorzowie Wielkopolskim	1889–now	1 January 2026	For registered residents, taxpayers, and students.
Portugal	Cascais	206,479	Mobi Cascais	2 January 2020–now	6.88 years	Free public bus transportation for residents, students and workers registered in the Municipality of Cascais. Cascais was the first in Portugal to implement the measure and is the fourth-largest city of the country.
Romania	Cluj-Napoca	411,379		18 June 2021	5.42 years	Free transportation on tram and bus lines every Friday
Romania	Arad	145,078	CTP Arad S.A.	7 July 2023	3.37 years	Free transportation on tram and bus lines every Friday.
Romania	Lugoj	37,700		1 July 2013	13.38 years	
Romania	Ploiești	201,226	TCE S.A.	31 March 2014	12.64 years	The benefits are limited to city residents with an income under 3,000 RON per month (about €670).
Russia	Miass, Chelyabinsk Oblast	151,387	municipality	1991–2002	13 years	Free trolleybuses and buses
Russia	Skolkovo, Moscow		ODAS Skolkovo + Mosgortrans	2012–now	14 years	Local buses are free, include to railway station (from 2019, weekdays, delayed), longer routes are charged unless they ride via Auchan or Vegas
Russia	Voronezh, Voronezh Oblast	1,032,382	municipality	2003–2013	10 years	Free buses run every 30 min. (designated by the letter Н)
Serbia	Belgrade	1,197,714	BG Voz, GSP Beograd, SP Lasta, Serbian Railways, and some private bus companies	1 January 2025–now	1.88 years	Free transport; includes all forms of public transport within the Belgrade Metropolitan Area.
Serbia	Jagodina	76,712	city	January 2019–now	7.88 years	Also includes 52 villages and settlements around Jagodina that are connected with the city.
Slovakia	Senec	19,900	MAD Senec	1 November 2013–now	13.05 years	1 April 2018 city transport has two bus lines. Temporarily suspended due to the COVID-19 pandemic until 1 September.
Slovenia	Nova Gorica	31,000		April 2006–now	20.63 years	
Spain	Manises	30,478	municipality			
Spain	Marbella	150,000	municipality	2019–now	7 years	Only for enrolled citizens.
Sweden	Avesta	21,000	Dalatrafik	2012	9 years	Ended due to increased operating costs.
Sweden	Kiruna	18,090		2011–December 2012	1 year	
Sweden	Övertorneå	2,000				70 km (43 mi) of free rides on local buses in this rural municipality
Sweden	Vellinge	37,700	Skånetrafiken	2020–now	6 years	Only for residents aged 70 or more within the confines of the county, and young adults aged 16 - 19 who may travel on Skånetrafiken and Öresundstågen services in Skåne
Ukraine	Kharkiv	1,421,125	municipality	2022		Including trams, metro, and trolleybus
Ukraine	Kryvyi Rih	603 904	municipality	2022		Includes trams, metrotram, and trolleybus
United Kingdom	Manchester, England		Bee Network	2002–now	24 years	2 Free bus routes around the City Centre
United Kingdom	West Midlands, England	2,953,816	all bus operators in the West Midlands	9 December 2024–9 December 2024	5 days	Free bus travel in the West Midlands bus boundary between 19:00 and 03:00.

=== Oceania ===
==== Australia ====
A free bus in Australia in 2025

State	Town/City	Population	Service/operator	First year	Duration	Notes
Northern Territory	Alice Springs	25,912	CDC Northern Territory	2025	since 2025	
Northern Territory	Darwin	139,902	CDC Northern Territory	2025	since 2025	
South Australia	Adelaide CBD	18,202	Adelaide Metro			Four bus routes that run a loop around the CBD and neighbouring North Adelaide are free, as well as all trams between the Adelaide Entertainment Centre and South Terrace.
Victoria	Docklands	15,495	Yarra Trams	2015	since 2014	All trams in the suburb are within the tram network's Free Tram Zone.
Victoria	Melbourne CBD	54,941	Yarra Trams	2015	since 2015	All trams in the suburb north of the Yarra River are within the tram network's Free Tram Zone.
Western Australia	Perth	13,670	Transperth			Free travel on buses and on trains between City West, Elizabeth Quay, and Claisebrook. All public transportation free on Sundays for SmartRider users.

== Perception and analysis ==
Fare-free transit has been repeatedly demonstrated to increase ridership—especially during non-peak travel periods—and customer satisfaction. Several analyses have shown ridership increased by as much as 15% overall and about 45% during the off-peak periods. The effects on public transport operators included schedule adherence problems because of the increased ridership and more complaints about rowdiness from younger passengers, though there is a reduction in altercations relating to fare collection. When the University of California, Los Angeles covered fares for the university community, ridership increased by 56% in the first year and solo driving fell by 20%.

In the United States, mass transit systems that collect fares are only expected to generate about 10% of the annual revenue themselves, with the remainder covered by either public or private investment and advertisements. Therefore, politicians and social-justice advocacy groups, such as the Swedish network Planka.nu, see zero-fare public transport as a low-cost, high-impact approach to reducing economic inequality. It has also been argued that transportation to and from work is essential to the employer in the managing of work hours, so financing of public transportation should fall to employers rather than private individuals or public funds.

== See also ==
- Car-free movement
- Effects of the car on societies
- Movimento Passe Livre, Brazilian movement campaigning for free public transport
- Planka.nu Swedish membership network which pays the penalty fare if you get caught without paying ticket
- Reduced fare programs
- Transport divide
- Universal basic services
- Universal transit pass
- Urban vitality
- 9-Euro-Ticket (in Germany in June, July and August 2022)
