= Fare evasion =

Act of travel without payment on public transit

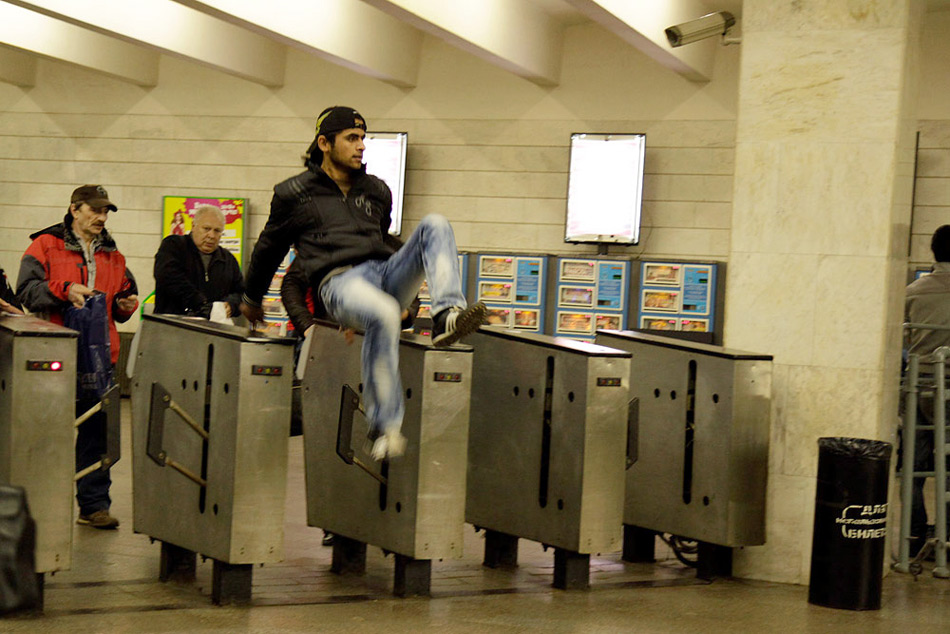
Turnstile jumping in the Moscow Metro

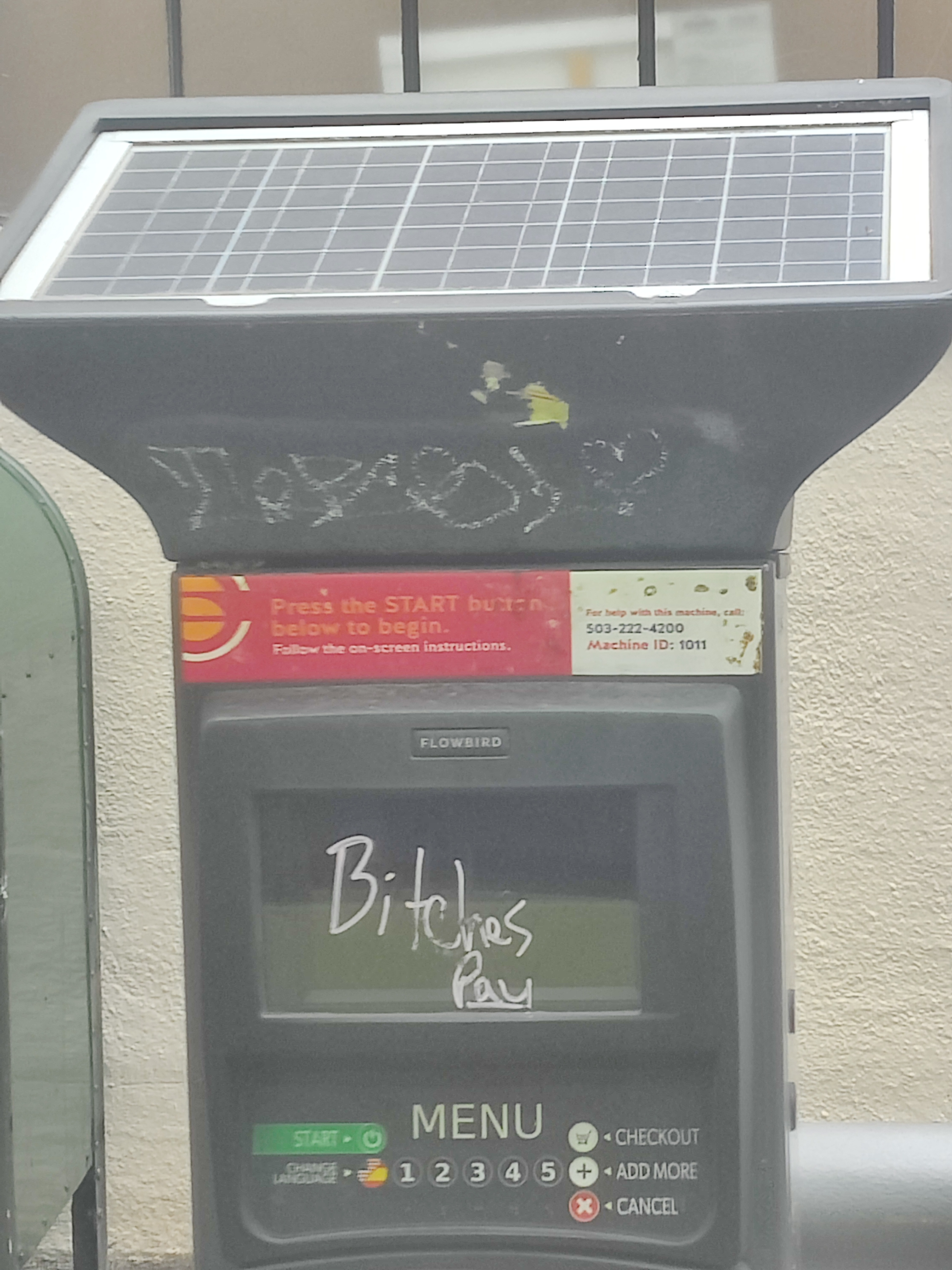
Graffiti on a Portland Streetcar ticket kiosk, advocating fare evasion

Fare evasion, also known as fare jumping, fare circumvention or fare dodging is the act of travel without payment on public transit. When considered problematic, it is mitigated by revenue protection officers and ticket barriers, staffed or automatic, are in place to ensure only those with valid tickets may access the transport. The term fare avoidance is sometimes used as a euphemistic synonym and sometimes used to refer to the lawful use of much cheaper tickets.

Fare evasion and fare fraud may or may not be a crime, depending on jurisdiction.

== Methods ==
=== On stations ===
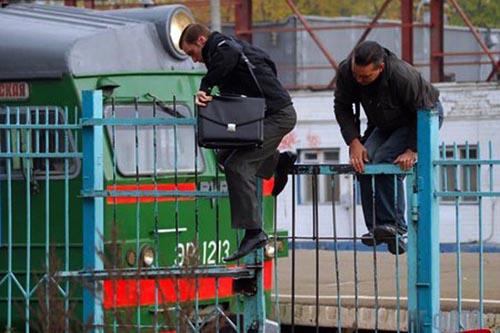
Climbing over fence of a commuter train station in Moscow, Russia (2015)

One method of fare evasion is jumping or climbing over the turnstiles which bar the entryway into a subway system; hence the term, "turnstile jumping". Fare-dodgers also can walk right behind a passenger with a valid ticket before closing of some types of ticket barrier gates (this is called tailgating). Other methods include adults traveling on children's tickets, or using discounted tickets or free passes that the passenger is not entitled to. They also can purchase valid tickets for shorter journeys in order to get through the entry and exit barriers at a lower price than their actual journey, or board a vehicle with just a platform ticket (called "doughnutting", as the ticket coverage looks like a doughnut on the Tube map). Fare evasion on trains or subways is also called "bumping trains".

=== On vehicles ===
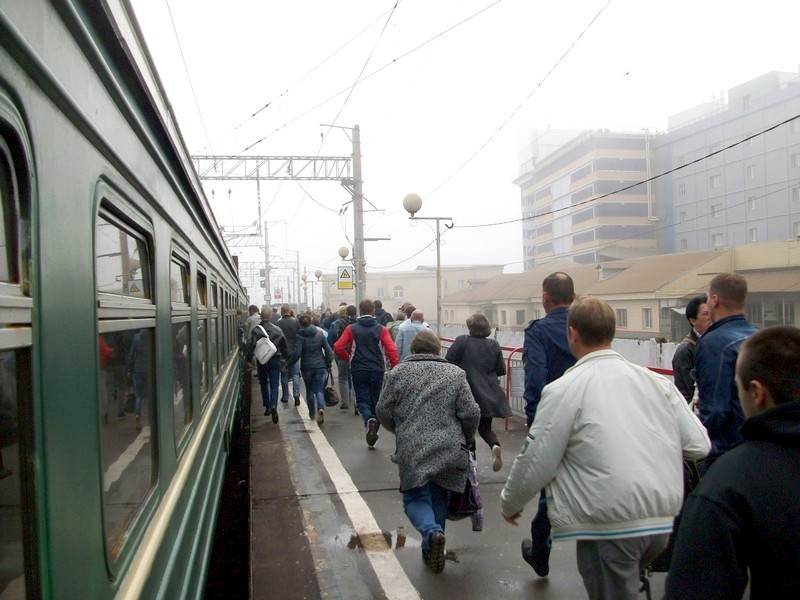
Fare evaders are running from ticket inspectors to the cars that they already checked at Zheleznodorozhnaya railway station, Balashikha, Russia (2015).

On vehicles fare-dodgers usually try to avoid ticket inspectors or conductors. On commuter trains with a sufficient number of passenger coaches one of the most common methods is walking away from ticket inspectors to other coaches and running on the platform in the opposite direction to the coaches that ticket inspectors already passed. On short commuter trains or especially intercity and long-distance passenger trains fare-dodgers can hide from ticket inspectors in toilets, luggage compartments, staff rooms and other utility chambers and cells inside the train.

Another issue occurs on the bus or tram; passengers either bypass the bus driver or enter through the rear door of the vehicle. If a bus or tram has a turnstile installed in it, fare-dodgers can jump over or crawl under the turnstile. In most countries passengers board a bus from any door, validate their tickets at machines and have no contact with the driver, thus increasing the potential for fare evasion.

A dangerous method of fare evasion practiced in some countries is riding on exterior parts of a vehicle (rooftops, rear parts, between cars, skitching, or underneath a vehicle), most commonly as train surfing. Fare dodgers may engage in this practice if it is very hard or impossible to hide from ticket inspectors inside a vehicle.

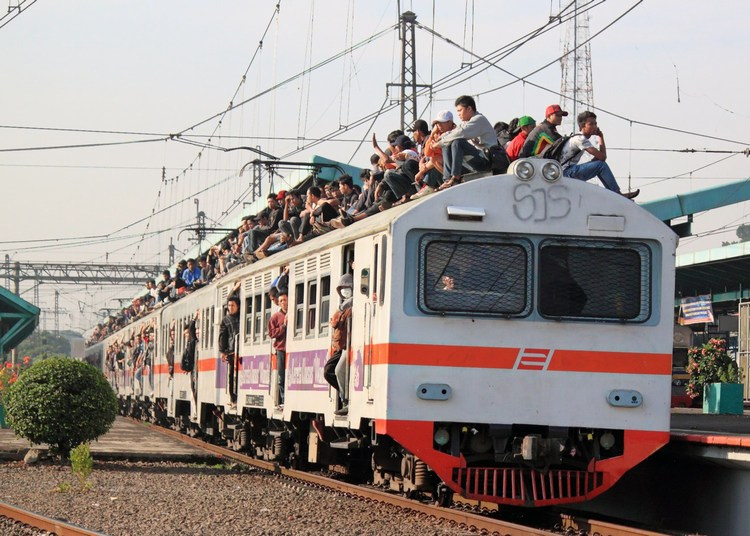
A crowded KRL Jabotabek train with passengers riding on the outside in Jakarta, Indonesia

Riding between coaches of a high-speed Siemens Velaro train "Sapsan" in Russia

== Countermeasures ==
=== Technical devices ===
==== Ticket barriers ====
Turnstiles are used to obstruct invalid access. Turnstiles may be replaced with ticket barriers in a less easily transversed form, or may be integrated more closely with an electronic ticket system. Ticket barriers can also require the travellers to show their tickets upon exiting. Typically turnstiles are used at train stations, however some city transit systems install turnstiles inside city street vehicles, for example buses and trams.

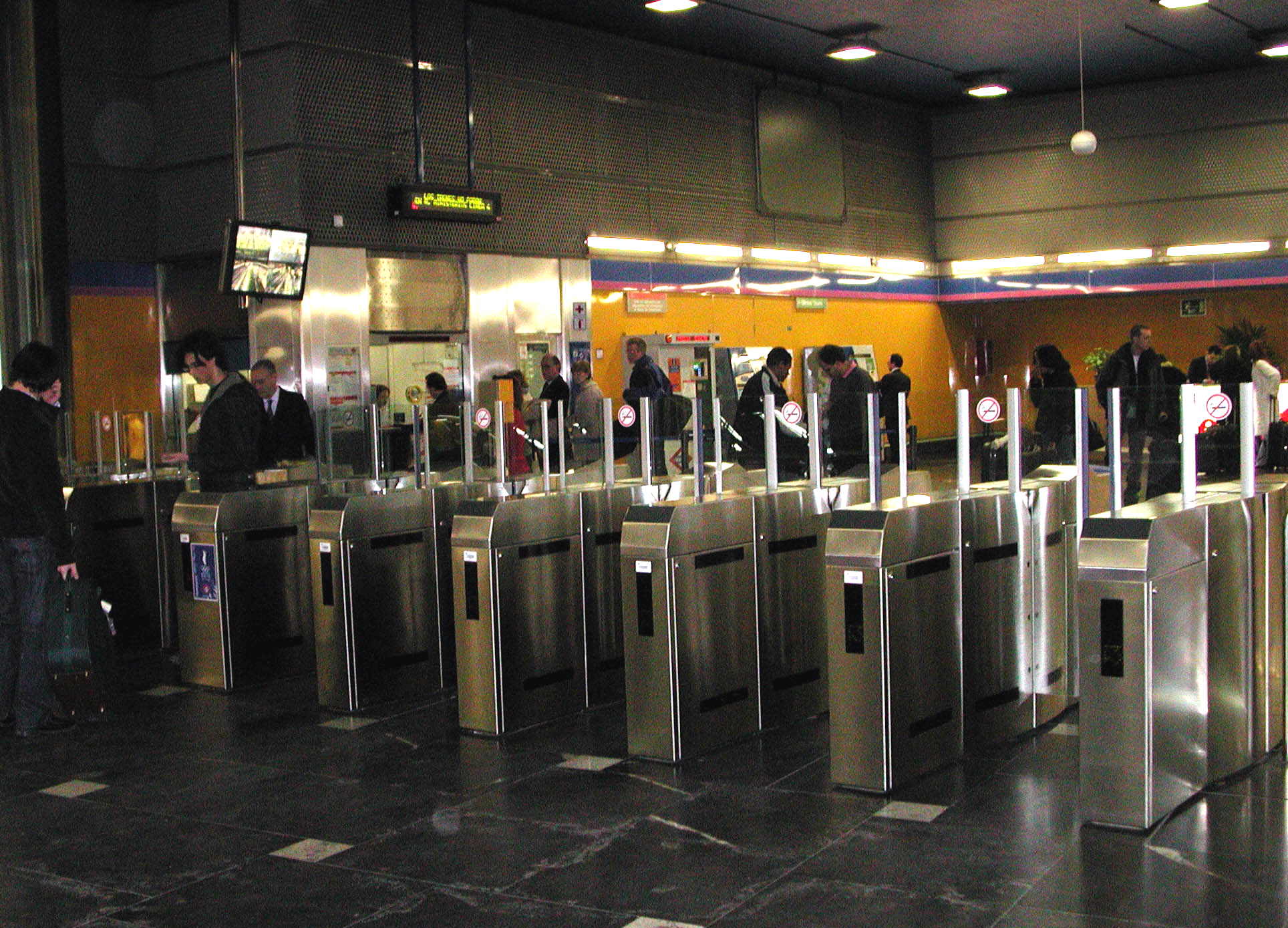
High Entrance Turnstiles in Madrid, Spain

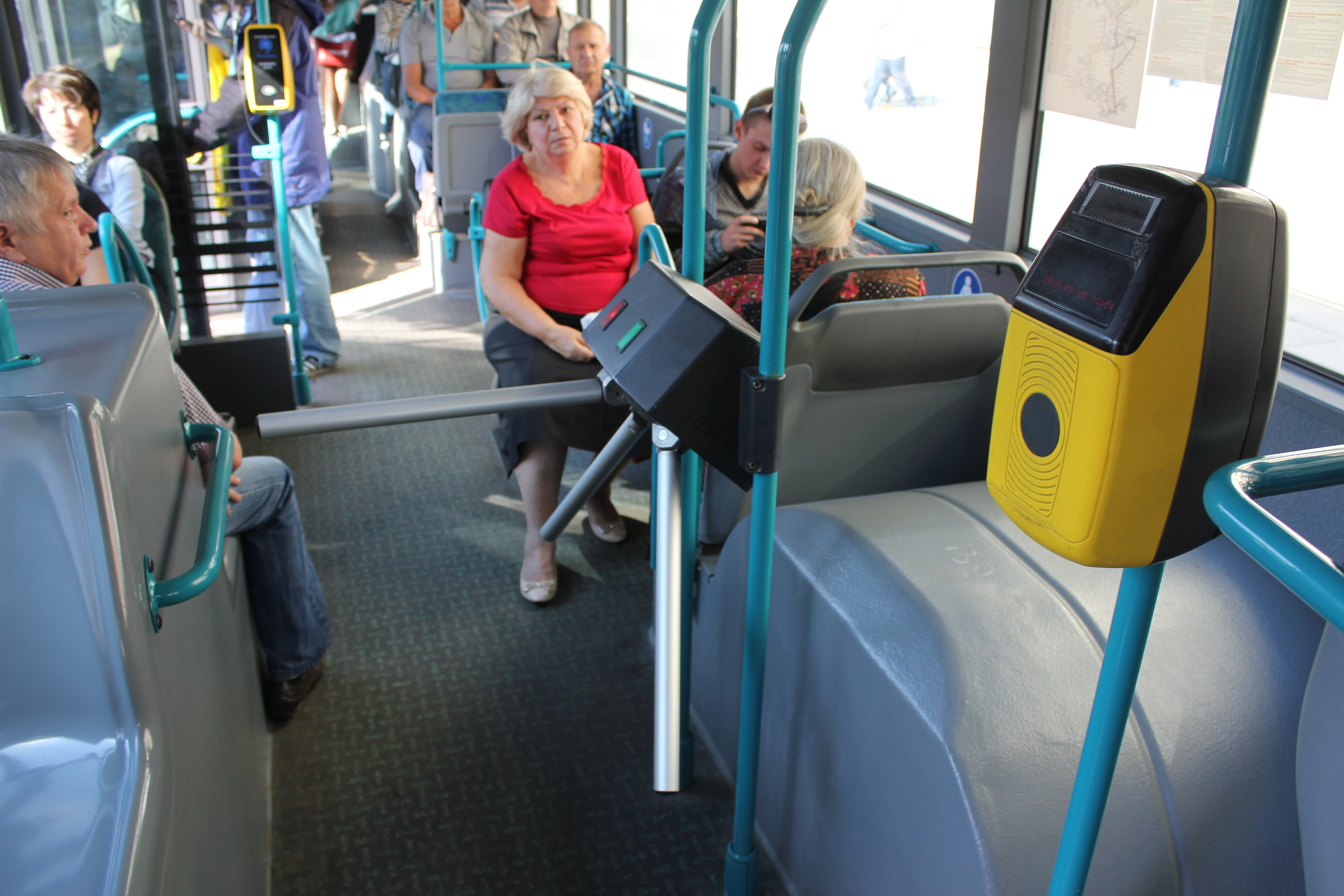
Turnstile in a bus in Moscow, Russia

==== Panic bars ====
As of 2006, panic bars on emergency exit doors were approved for installation in all stations of the New York City Subway. Panic bar alarms have been silenced since 2014 due to regularity of non-emergency passenger use.

=== Ticket inspectors ===
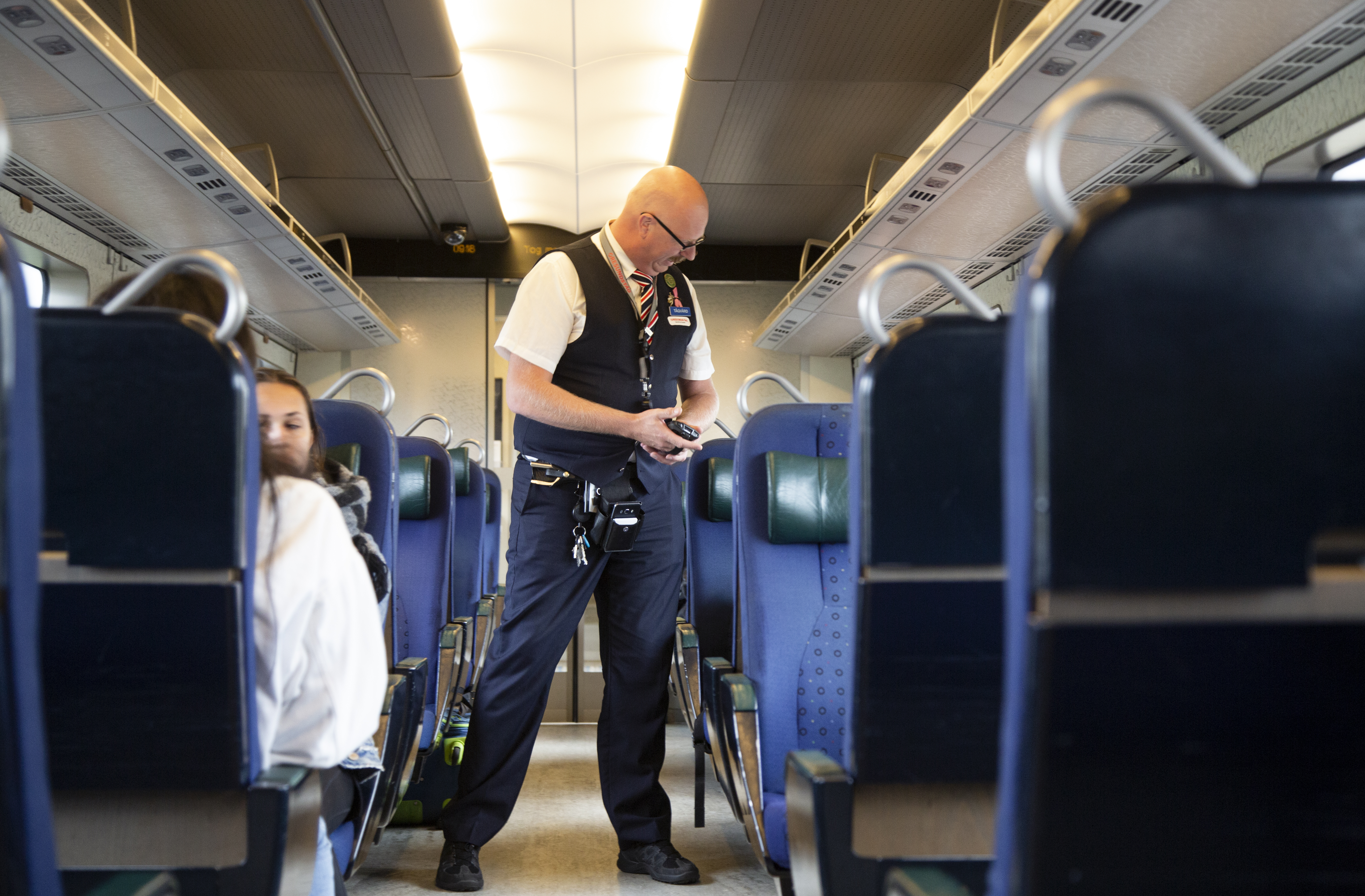
A railway conductor checking tickets on an Øresundståg train

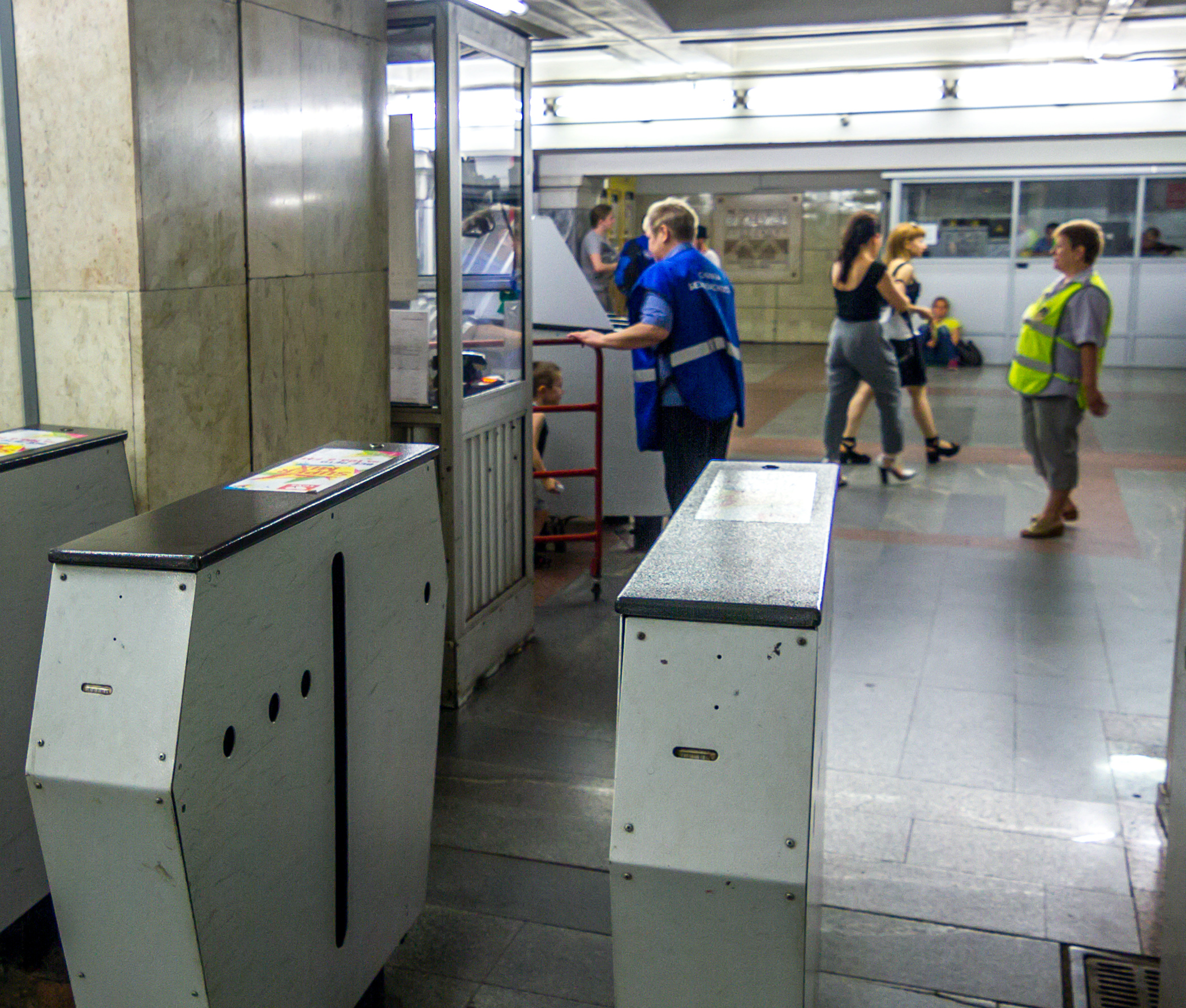
Ticket inspector and guard watching the turnstiles in Moscow Metro

With manual fare collection, fare evasion can become more difficult and stigmatizing for the fare-dodging traveller, especially usage of discounted tickets (for example child, student or pensioner tickets) by passengers who are not allowed to use it. Ticket inspectors can verify tickets of passengers during the trip or during a boarding on vehicle (the last form of fare control is a common practice on long-distance rail transport). In some cases ticket inspectors are assigned to a certain vehicle during its trip on the entire route (usually on long-distance or some commuter transport) and often, in another case they randomly check multiple vehicles (usually city public transport and some commuter transport). Transit systems which use honor systems under normal circumstances may employ staff to collect fares at times and places where heavy use can be expected—for example, at stations serving a stadium after the conclusion of a major sporting event.

Ticket inspectors can also watch for turnstiles at train stations to avoid unauthorized passing without a valid ticket and using discounted tickets. Ticket inspectors may or may not be allowed to use force to prevent or apprehend fare-dodgers.

== Penalization ==
=== Penalty fare ===
A penalty fare is a special fare charged at a higher than normal price because the purchaser did not comply with the normal ticket purchasing rules. Typically penalty fares are incurred by passengers failing to purchase a ticket before travelling or by purchasing an incorrect ticket which does not cover their whole journey.

Penalty fares are not fines, and are used when no legal basis for prosecuting fare evasion exists, prosecution is deemed too drastic and costly, or is unlikely to result in conviction.

==== Forced prepayment for future trips ====
Where possible, requiring a fare evader to prepay for future trips may serve as an educational penalty to prevent more violations.

=== Civil and criminal penalties ===
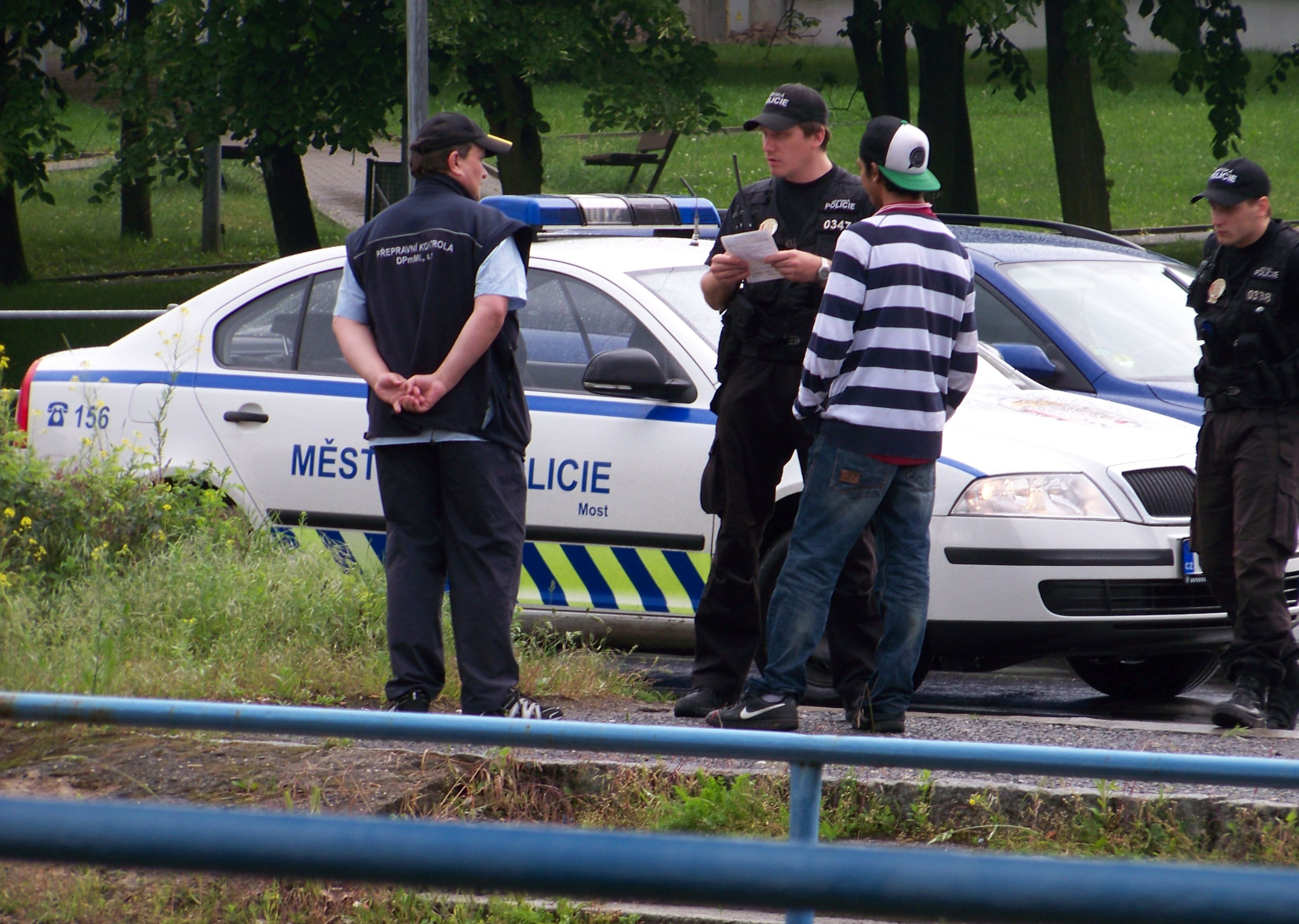
Ticket inspector and police officers fine a fare-dodger in the Czech Republic.

On some systems, fare evasion is considered a misdemeanor. In such cases, police officers and in some cases transit employees are authorized to issue tickets which usually carry a fine. Then, charged persons can be tried in court. Repeat violators and severe cases, such as ticket forgery, are punished more severely and sometimes involve incarceration. Wealthy offenders sometimes face stiffer penalties than poorer offenders.

The MBTA apprehended vandals damaging AFC equipment while evading, and published the video footage.

In December 2018, the Council of the District of Columbia voted to decriminalize fare evasion. Prior to decriminalization, over 90% of citations and summons for fare evasion were issued to African Americans. Fare evasion in Washington, D.C., is now a civil offense with a $50 fine, rather than a criminal offense with up to 10 days in jail and a $300 fine.

== See also ==
- Farebox recovery ratio
- Fare strike
- Stowaway
- Public transport security
- British Transport Police
- New York City Transit fare evasion
- Planka.nu
