= Planka.nu =

Swedish organization for public transport

- Planka.nu
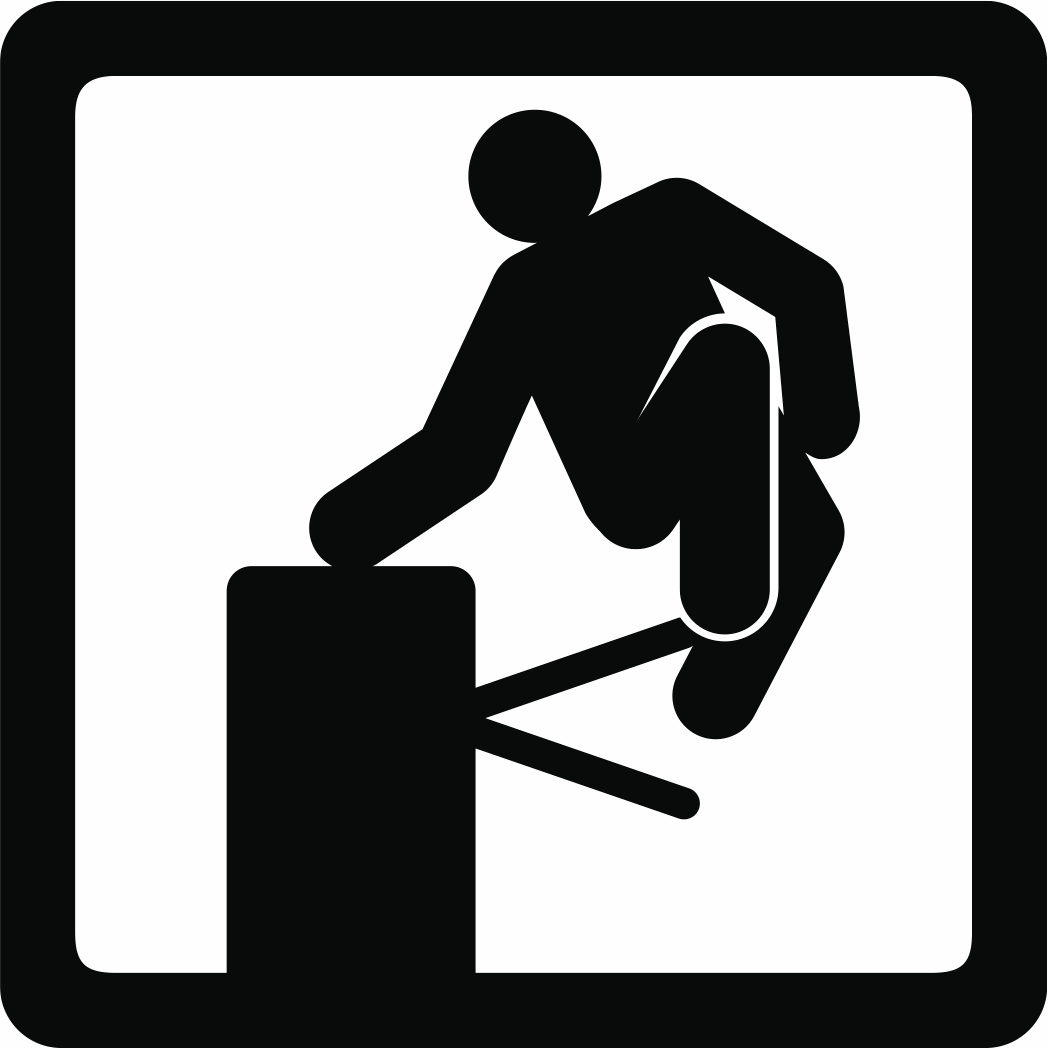
- Founded: 2001
- Location: Sweden
- Website: planka.nu

Planka.nu is a network of organizations in Sweden promoting tax-financed zero-fare public transport with chapters in Stockholm, Gothenburg, Skåne and Östergötland. Planka.nu was founded in 2001 by the Swedish Anarcho-syndicalist Youth Federation in response to the increasingly expensive ticket prices in the public transport system in Stockholm. The campaign has received much attention because of the controversial methods used to promote free public transport: Planka.nu encourage people to fare-dodge in the public transport, aiding its members in paying penalty fares through the insurance fund p-kassan.

== History ==
In 2001, the Stockholm chapter of the Swedish Anarcho-syndicalist Youth Federation (Swedish: SUF, Syndikalistiska Ungdomsförbundet) launched the campaign Planka.nu (literally, fare-dodge.now) as a reaction to a rise in ticket prices by the Stockholm County Council. The domain name .nu, which belongs to the 260-square-kilometre (100 sq mi) island of Niue but is sold primarily to foreigners, was chosen because it means "now" in Swedish. The standard top level domain for Sweden is .se.

With growing membership and interest, the campaign was detached from the SUF to form an independent organization. Local organizations have since started up in Gothenburg in 2003, Östergötland in 2005 and Skåne in 2009. A sister organization, pumm.it has been created in Helsinki, Finland. In November 2008, Planka.nu released Freepublictransports.com, a global forum for the free public transport movement.

Ticket fares in Stockholm have increased dramatically over time. By one measure—single ticket price for a 10-kilometre (6.2 mi) journey—Stockholm has the most expensive-to-use public transport in the world, as of March 2009.

== Activism ==
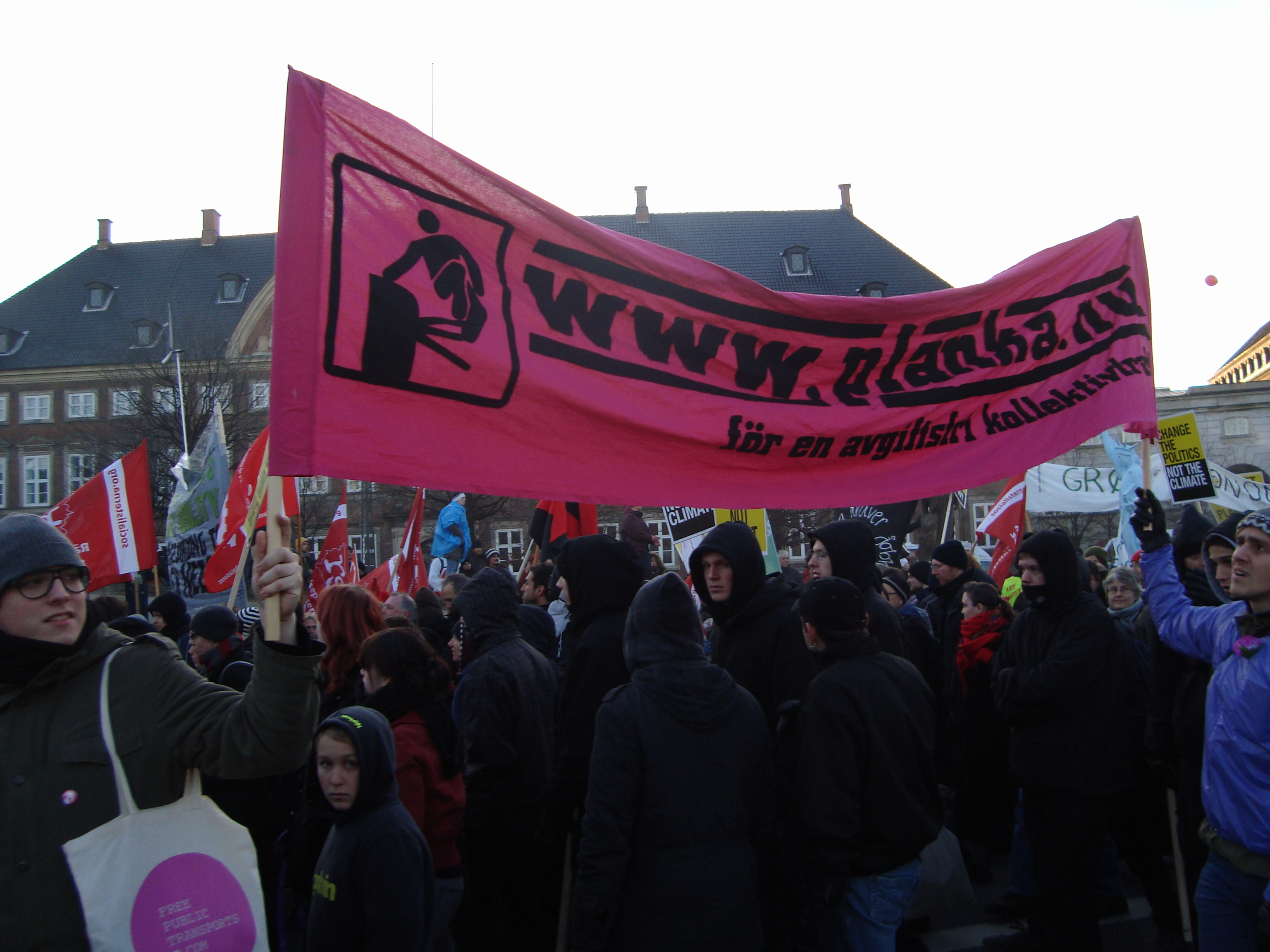
Planka.nu demonstrating at the COP15.

In the tradition of the Italian autonomists, Planka.nu advocate self-reduction, where the price of the service is determined by the consumer. Whereas in other cases this is done in agreement with (at least some) employees of the service provider, in the case of Planka.nu fare-dodgers are encouraged to evade fares without seeking permission.

Since its conception Planka.nu has broadened its methods and now functions as a think tank with public transport, urban planning and climate change as its main areas of focus, as well as an insurance fund. The network also uses standard leftist methods, such as rallies, adbusting, and pamphlets. Together with refugee rights organization Ingen människa är illegal, the Swedish chapter of No one is illegal, Planka.nu provides tickets for immigrants living in Sweden without asylum, since a paperless immigrant might otherwise be reported to the police and deported if caught riding without a ticket.

=== P-kassan ===
Failing to purchase a ticket or traveling using an incorrect pass is subject to a penalty fare of 1200 SEK in the public transport systems of Stockholm, Gothenburg and Östergötland. In return for a membership fee (paid monthly or biannually) members are refunded by Planka.nu if fined, through the solidarity fund P-kassan. Net income from p-kassan is used in the aforementioned partnership with No one is illegal and to finance the production of flyers, stickers, folders, web pages and other information material. All members of Planka.nu work pro-bono.

In December 2009, Västtrafik accused the Gothenburg chapter of operating an unauthorized insurance.

== Criticism ==
Planka.nu and its organizers have seen substantial criticism, primarily by politicians and transportation companies in each city. The network has been reported to the police for incitement by Storstockholms Lokaltrafik (SL), Västtrafik and ÖstgötaTrafiken, who believe that Planka.nu engages in illegal activities. As of today, no charges have been made. Planka.nu themselves believe that their activities do not conflict with existing legislation.

Many critics believe that fare evasion leads to reduced funds and higher costs for public transport, which must be offset by higher prices for those who do pay their fares.

In 2004, the Stockholm University Student Union received media attention after first permitting a meeting of the network on its premises and later barring Planka.nu when criticism was voiced.

== Publications ==
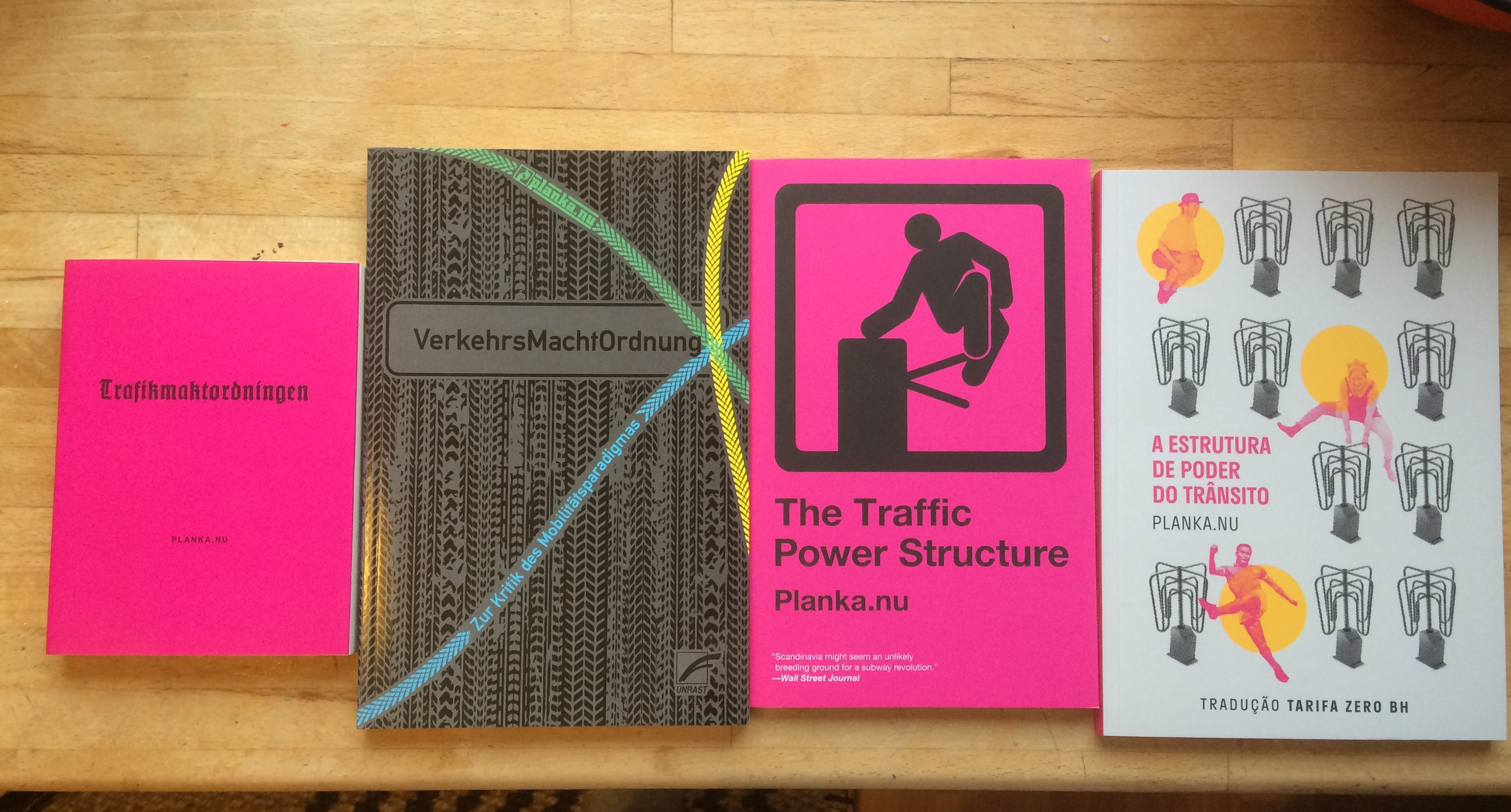
Trafikmaktordningen in four different languages.

Planka.nu has released four larger policy papers: Highway to Hell? criticizing the plans for the express beltway Förbifart Stockholm around Stockholm, Travel Doesn't Have to Cost the Earth proposing a set of measures to make the transport sector in Stockholm more climate-friendly, Till varje pris? (At any cost?) a report about the costs of ticketing in the public transport system in Stockholm, and Trafikmaktsordningen (The Traffic Power Structure) regarding the hierarchies of transportation and how it relates to social mobility and class.

In 2011Trafikmaktordningen was published as a book in Sweden. Since then, it has been translated into German, English and Brazilian Portuguese.

== See also ==
- Ticket barrier
- Stockholm Metro
- Gothenburg tram
