= University of Michigan Transit Services =

Public transit operator serving the University of Michigan

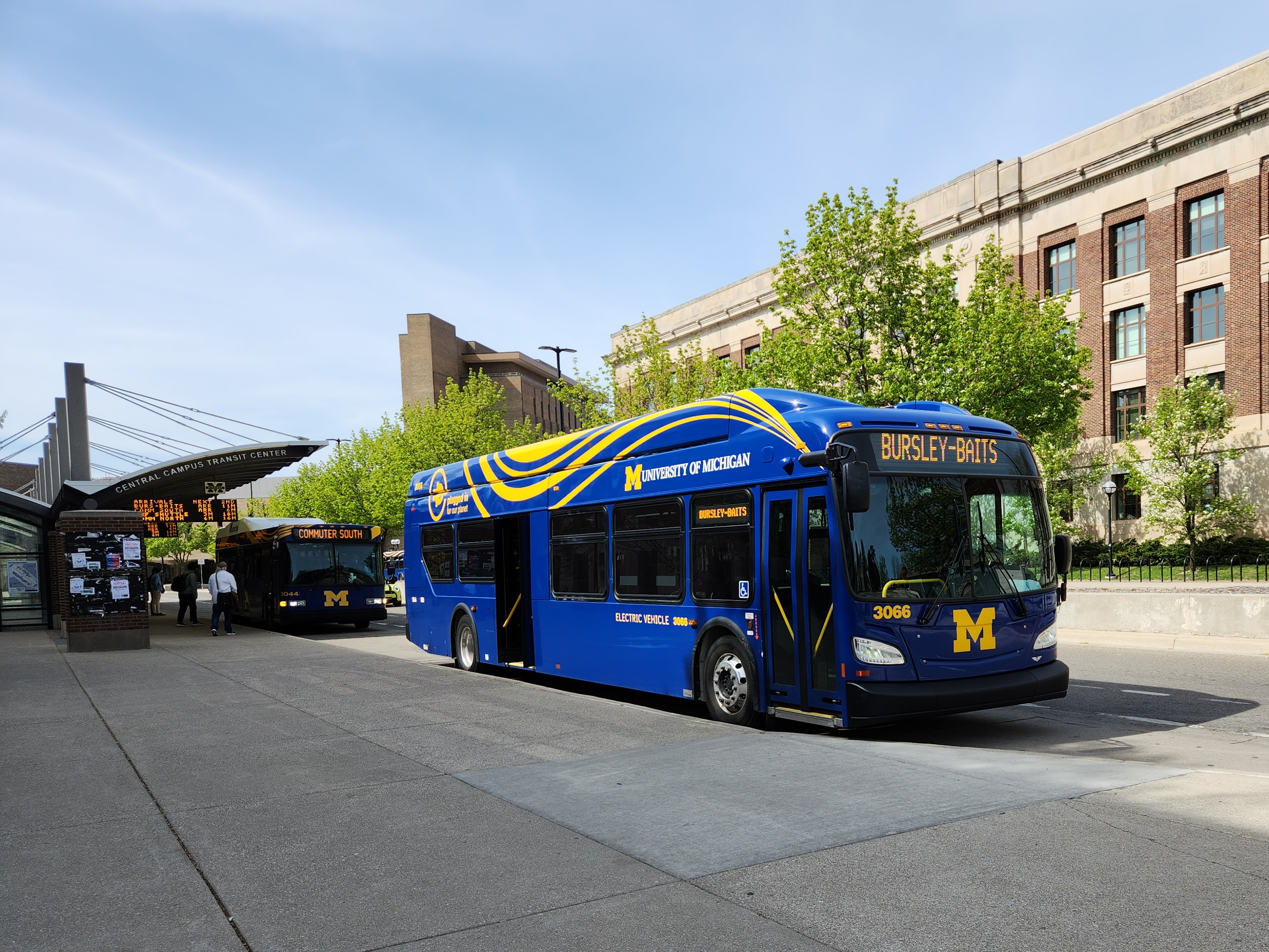
- Parent: University of Michigan
- Commenced operation: 1945; 81 years ago
- Service area: Ann Arbor, Michigan
- Service type: Fare-free university and hospital shuttle service
- Alliance: Ann Arbor Area Transportation Authority
- Routes: 12
- Hubs: Central Campus Transit Center; Pierpont Commons
- Daily ridership: 19,500 (weekdays, 2023)
- Annual ridership: 5.3 million (2023)
- Website: ltp.umich.edu

University of Michigan Transit Services is a public transit operator in Ann Arbor, Michigan, operated by the University of Michigan. U-M Transit routes serve the university's Ann Arbor campus and the main facilities of Michigan Medicine, carrying over 5 million passengers per year. The service is nicknamed the "Blue Bus" by students. U-M Transit services operate year-round, and are free and open to the public.

U-M Transit is distinct from the Ann Arbor Area Transportation Authority (TheRide), the public transit operator for the entire Ann Arbor metropolitan area. TheRide operates multiple routes serving the university's campuses, and university students and staff ride TheRide buses for free. The university and TheRide collaborate closely on some services, but are administratively and operationally independent.

== Services ==
=== Routes ===
As of 2025, the university operates 12 bus routes, with two main types of service. All services are open to the public, and are free to ride. 8 of the 12 routes operate along a northeast-southwest corridor extending from Michigan Stadium in the south to Domino's Farms in the northeast, which serves most of the university's Ann Arbor operations.

A group of Michigan Medicine-focused routes serve staff and patients of the university's hospitals, connecting remote parking lots with centrally located clinics and research facilities. These routes operate year-round and primarily on weekdays, with schedules coordinated to serve shift workers.

A group of campus-focused routes serves the academic operations of the university, transporting students from dormitories at the edges of the campus to classrooms. Campus-focused routes have higher service levels during the fall and winter semesters, including weekend and late-night service.

=== Connections ===
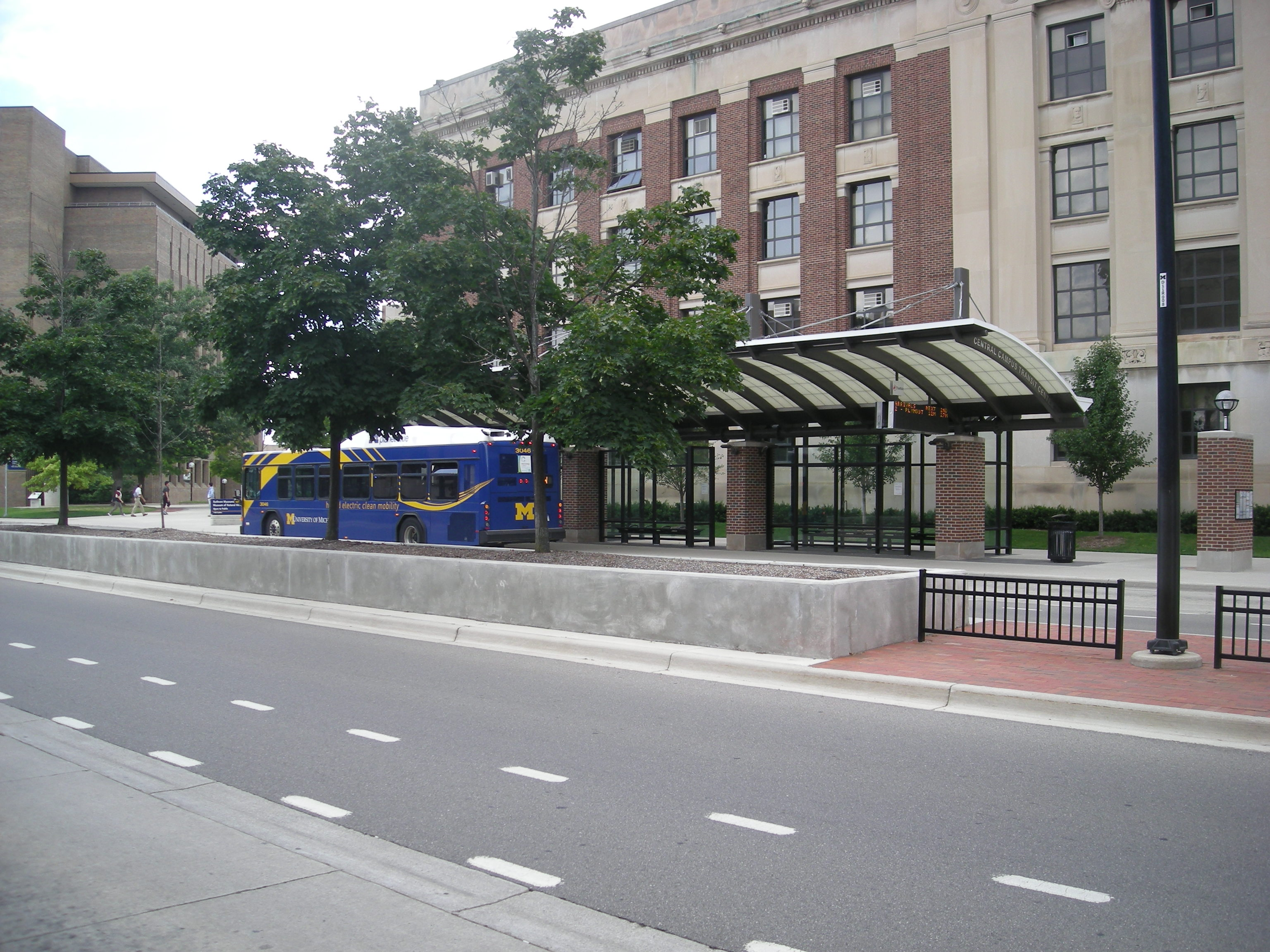
The Central Campus Transit Center in 2013

U-M Transit buses connect with TheRide services in multiple locations. The Central Campus Transit Center is the main bus station on the university's Central Campus, and most services to North Campus stop in front of the Pierpont Commons student union. Other major connection points include the Green Road and Plymouth Road park-and-ride lots near North Campus, the Michigan Union on Central Campus, and the Ann Arbor VA Hospital.

== History ==
The University of Michigan began classes in Ann Arbor in 1841. As the city and the university grew in the late 19th century, transportation options improved. The Michigan Central Railroad constructed a new, larger depot in the city in 1886, and university students were frequent users of the Ann Arbor and Ypsilanti Street Railway, which began service in 1891. The opening of the "Ypsi-Ann" provided new social opportunities for the student bodies of both U-M and the Michigan State Normal School in Ypsilanti. U-M banned students from owning cars in 1925. Exemptions to the policy were added throughout the mid-20th century, although the ban remained in effect through the 1960s.

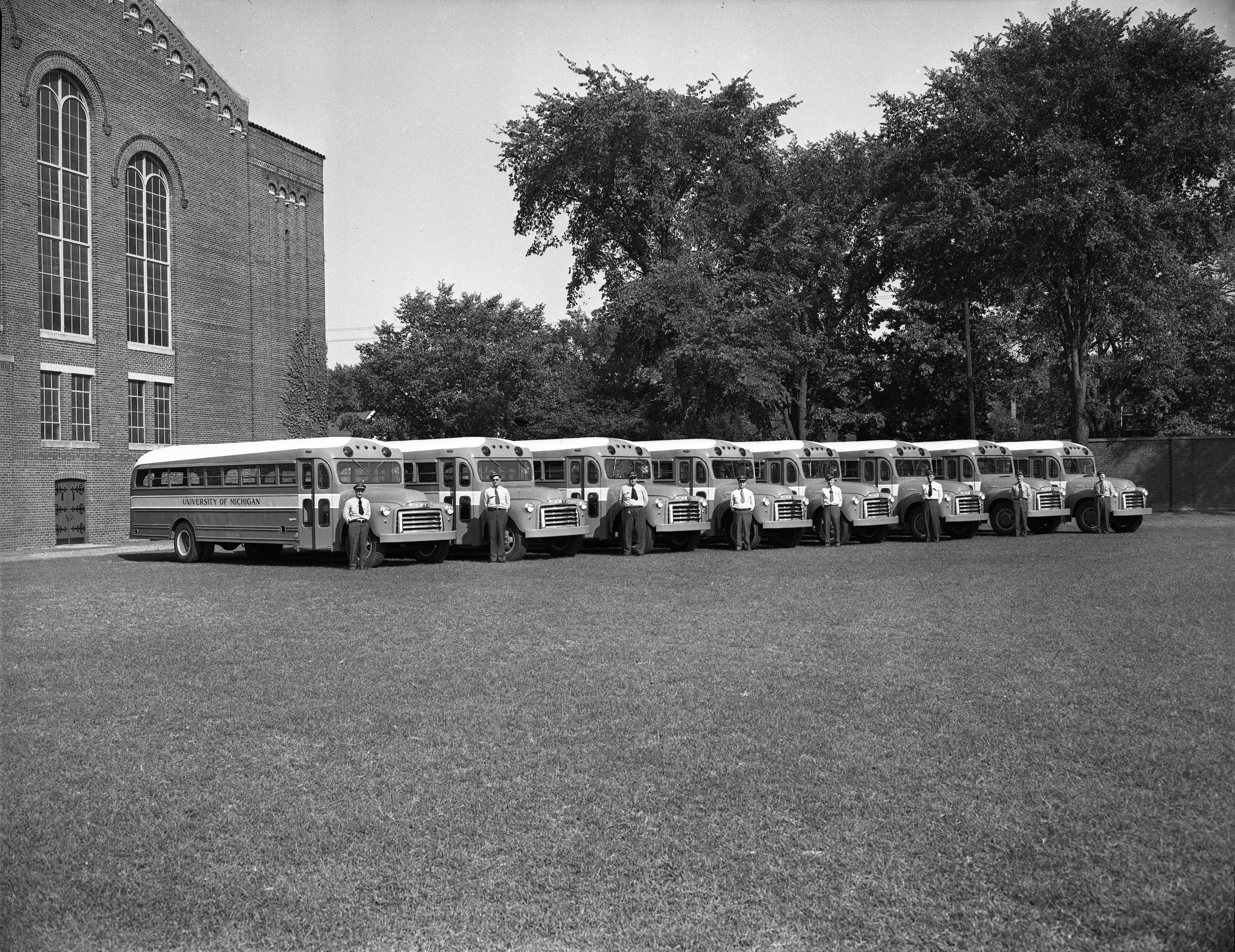
University bus drivers pose with new buses in September 1948

Following the end of World War II, universities nationwide experienced a spike in enrollment from returning soldiers, supported by the G.I. Bill. At U-M, some veteran students were housed in the Willow Village temporary apartment complex near Willow Run, connected to the campus by a bus service. The university began buying its own bus fleet within 2 years, replacing buses leased from the federal government. Willow Village was redeveloped into single-family houses beginning in the mid-1950s, and its bus service ended in 1955.

In the late 1950s and 1960s, the university grew with the construction of North Campus. Built on 267 acres (108 ha) of farmland northeast of the main campus, North Campus was master-planned by Eero Saarinen, and was intended to be an extension of the main campus. Instead, North Campus became a separate part of the city, connected to the main campus by increasingly-frequent bus service. Additionally, the university began a system of park-and-ride bus services in the 1950s, initially serving a lot near Michigan Stadium.

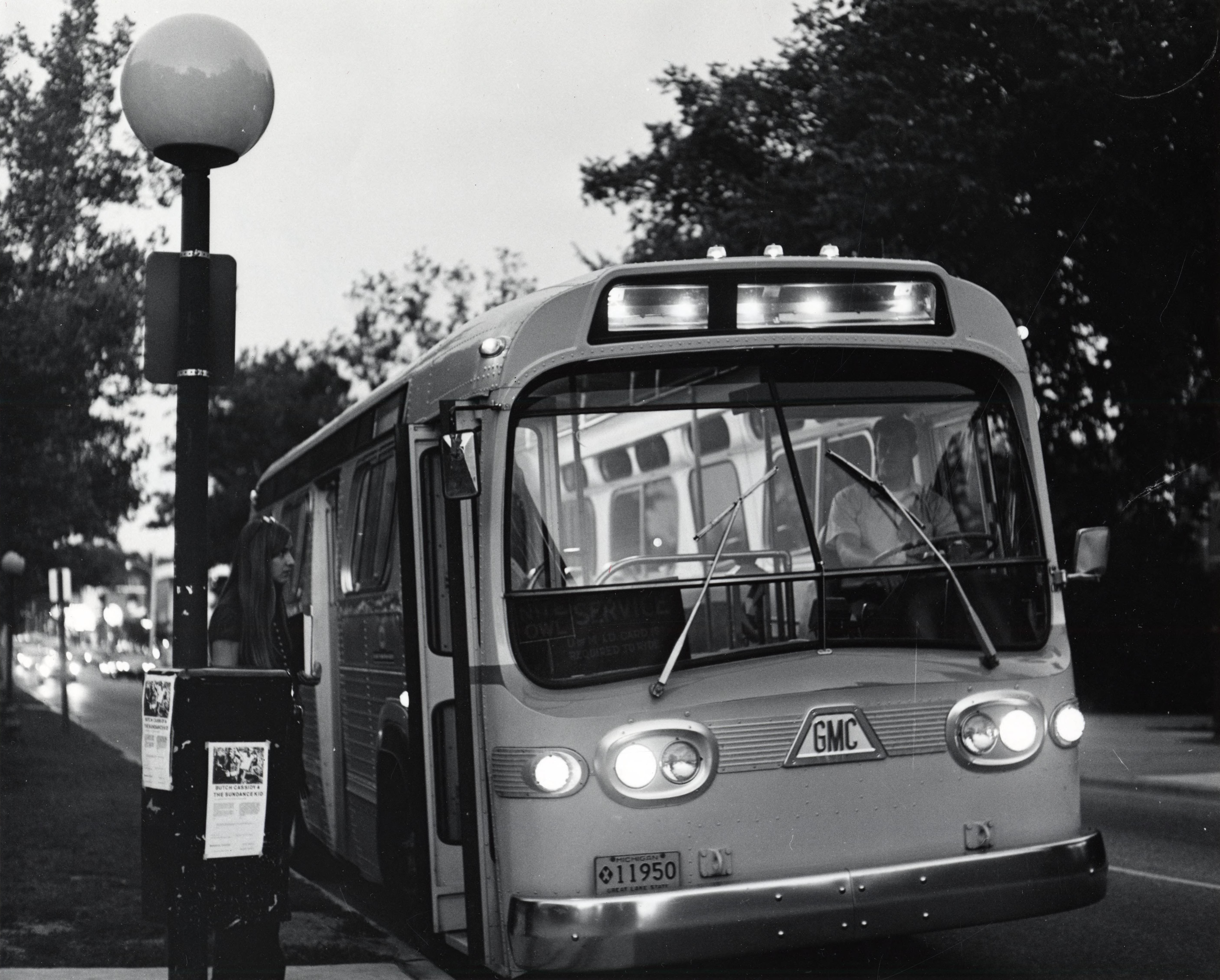
U-M night bus in 1970

The quality of bus service to North Campus and the commuter lots became a frequent point of contention among U-M students as the campus developed. For example, a 1967 Michigan Daily editorial detailed a petition signed by the residents of the then-new Vera Baits Houses on North Campus, which held that the dining, recreation, and transportation services for those residents was inadequate. Among the Baits residents' complaints was that the university's bus service began too late and ended too early, preventing students from eating breakfast before 8 AM classes and stifling nightlife.

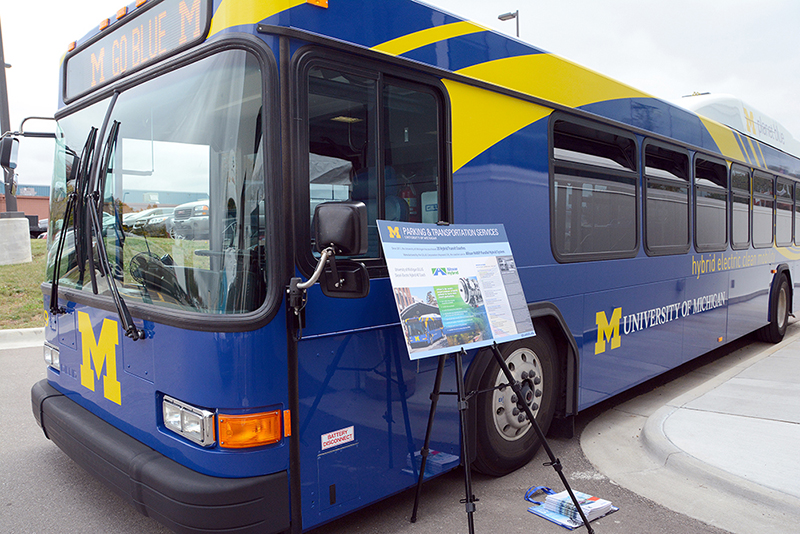
Hybrid bus on display at an EPA event in 2015

U-M Transit introduced hybrid-electric buses in 2012, funded by university sustainability initiatives and Federal Transit Administration grants. From 2012 to 2014, three U-M Transit buses were equipped with experimental vehicle-to-infrastructure hardware as part of a citywide experiment, conducted in cooperation with the USDOT and the University of Michigan Transportation Research Institute. The experimental equipment provided pedestrian detection at a major intersection near the University of Michigan Hospital and speed warnings along a curve on North Campus, two locations that are served by the majority of the university's bus routes.

The university proposed a new operations facility on North Campus in the early 2010s. The new facility would replace the existing operations center near Michigan Stadium, which was undersized. Construction of the facility was approved by the Board of Regents in 2014, but was cancelled in 2016 after opposition from nearby residents. A new plan for the facility with a smaller footprint was approved by the Regents in 2020, and opened for service in 2022. The new Dean Road Transportation Facility provides the university with maintenance capacity for articulated buses, and charging infrastructure for battery-electric buses. The university's first battery-electric buses were placed into service in 2023.

In response to the COVID-19 pandemic in 2020, U-M Transit redesigned its route network to promote social distancing and shorter travel times. Routes were revised to prevent passengers from staying on a bus for longer than 15 minutes. The revised route network operated until the fall 2021 semester, when COVID-19 vaccines became more widely available and bus capacities could be increased.

== In culture ==
The university's bus services were featured in a long-running student orientation video titled "The Michigan Transportation Musical," featuring the character of "Billy Magic" as a mentor to a confused student attempting to navigate the campus.
