= RoadRUNNER Transit =

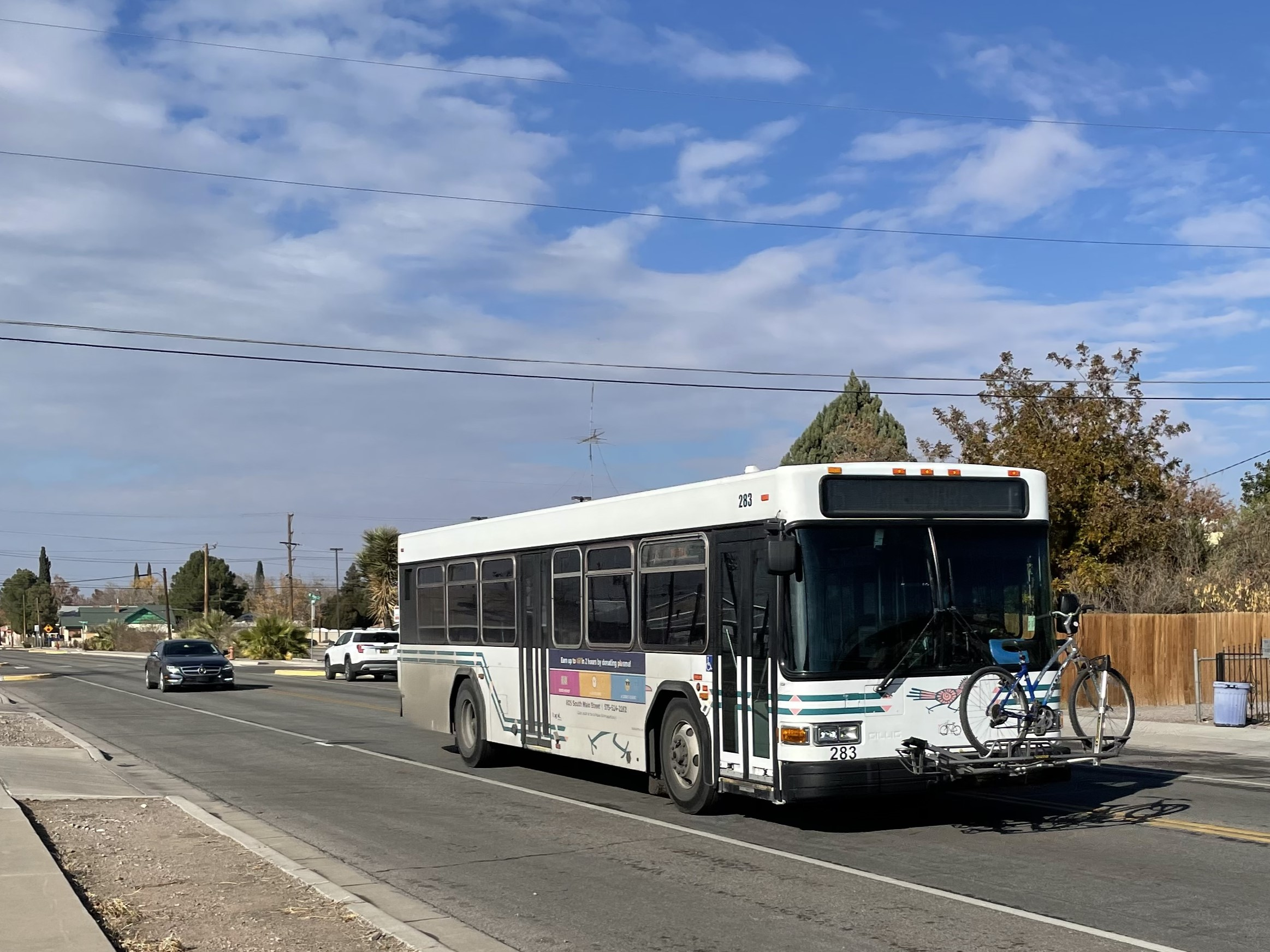
- A RoadRUNNER Transit bus in Las Cruces, NM
- Parent: City of Las Cruces
- Headquarters: Las Cruces, New Mexico
- Service area: Las Cruces, New Mexico
- Service type: Public transportation
- Routes: 9
- Hubs: Central Transfer Point; Mesilla Valley Mall; Venus Transfer Point
- Fleet: 15 buses
- Fuel type: Diesel
- Website: RoadRUNNER Transit

RoadRUNNER Transit is the local public transit authority serving Las Cruces, New Mexico.

== Routes ==
All bus routes operate Monday-Saturday. There is no Sunday service.

No.	Areas served	Notes	Map
1	Main, Telshor, Del Rey, Elks		
2	El Paseo, University, Telshor, DACC		
3	Roadrunner, Highway 70, Mesilla Valley Mall		
4	Amador, South Valley, Town of Mesilla, Union		
5	Alameda, Picacho, Motel		
6	Valley, Missouri, Walnut, Evelyn, Madrid, Hoagland	Route 6 runs counterclockwise and Route 7 runs clockwise.	
7	Valley, Missouri, Walnut, Evelyn, Madrid, Hoagland	Route 6 runs counterclockwise and Route 7 runs clockwise.	
8	Lohman, Mesilla Valley Mall, Triviz, University, Solano, Amador		

== Fleet ==
=== Current fleet ===
Quantity	Year	Model	Length	Disabled access	Comments
3	2000	Nova Bus RTS	35 feet
8	2004	Gillig Advantage Low Floor	35 feet		First low floor buses.
4	2008	Gillig Advantage Low Floor	35 feet		Replaced older non-ADA compliant buses.

In addition, RoadRUNNER Transit added two new low-floor minibuses in 2011. These buses are used on both fixed route and paratransit service.

=== Retired fleet ===
Quantity	Year	Retired	Model	Length	Disabled access	Comments
3	1986	2008	Orion I	30 feet		Replacement: Gillig Advantage Low Floor (2008)
2	1989	2008	TMC RTS	35 feet		Replacement: Gillig Advantage Low Floor (2008)

== Depots ==
The authority has a facility at Hadley Avenue. In October 2022, construction started on a replacement facility at Westway Avenue.

== Future plans ==
RoadRUNNER Transit unveiled their 2010-2015 Transit Strategic Plan on August 20, 2009. Some ongoing improvements include but are not limited to increased frequency and number of routes and the addition of more bus shelters. Short-term plans include improvements to ADA facilities, addition of Braille to bus stop posts, extended Saturday service, and the addition of hybrid electric buses.
