= Terre Haute Transit =

Transportation provider in Terre Haute, Indiana

Terre Haute Transit Utility
- Headquarters: 901 S. 14th Street
- Locale: Terre Haute, IN
- Service type: bus service, paratransit
- Routes: 8
- Fleet: 11
- Annual ridership: 299,949 (2009)
- Fuel type: diesel, hybrid electric, gasoline
- Website: transit-department

Terre Haute Transit Utility or Terre Haute City Bus provides public transportation in the city of Terre Haute, Vigo County, Indiana.

== Services ==
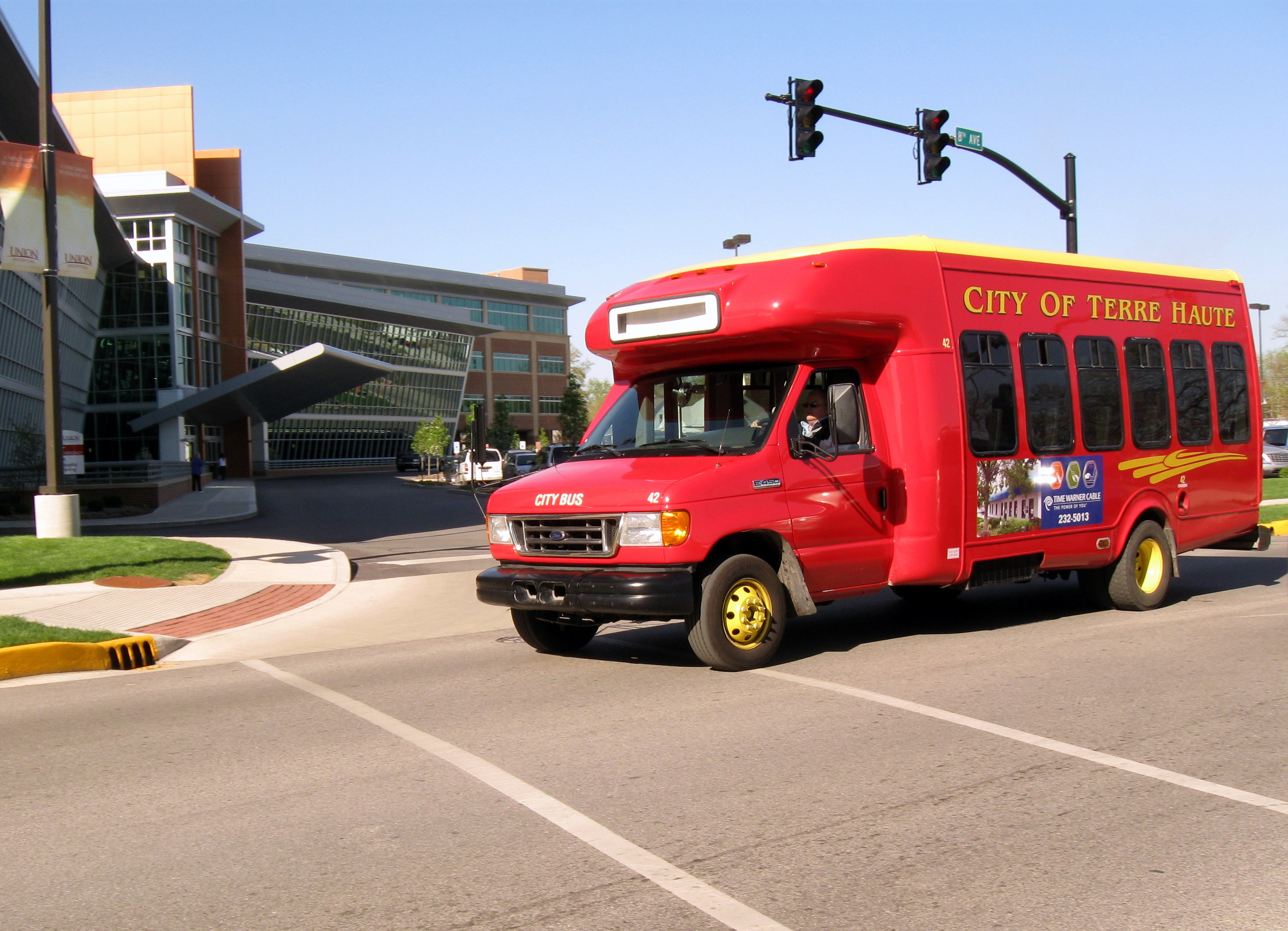
N 9th/12 Pts Route passing Union Hospital

Transportation is provided Monday through Saturday on 6 day and 3 evening fixed route lines along with two campus routes. One through the Indiana State University campus and another connecting to the Ivy Tech Main Campus.

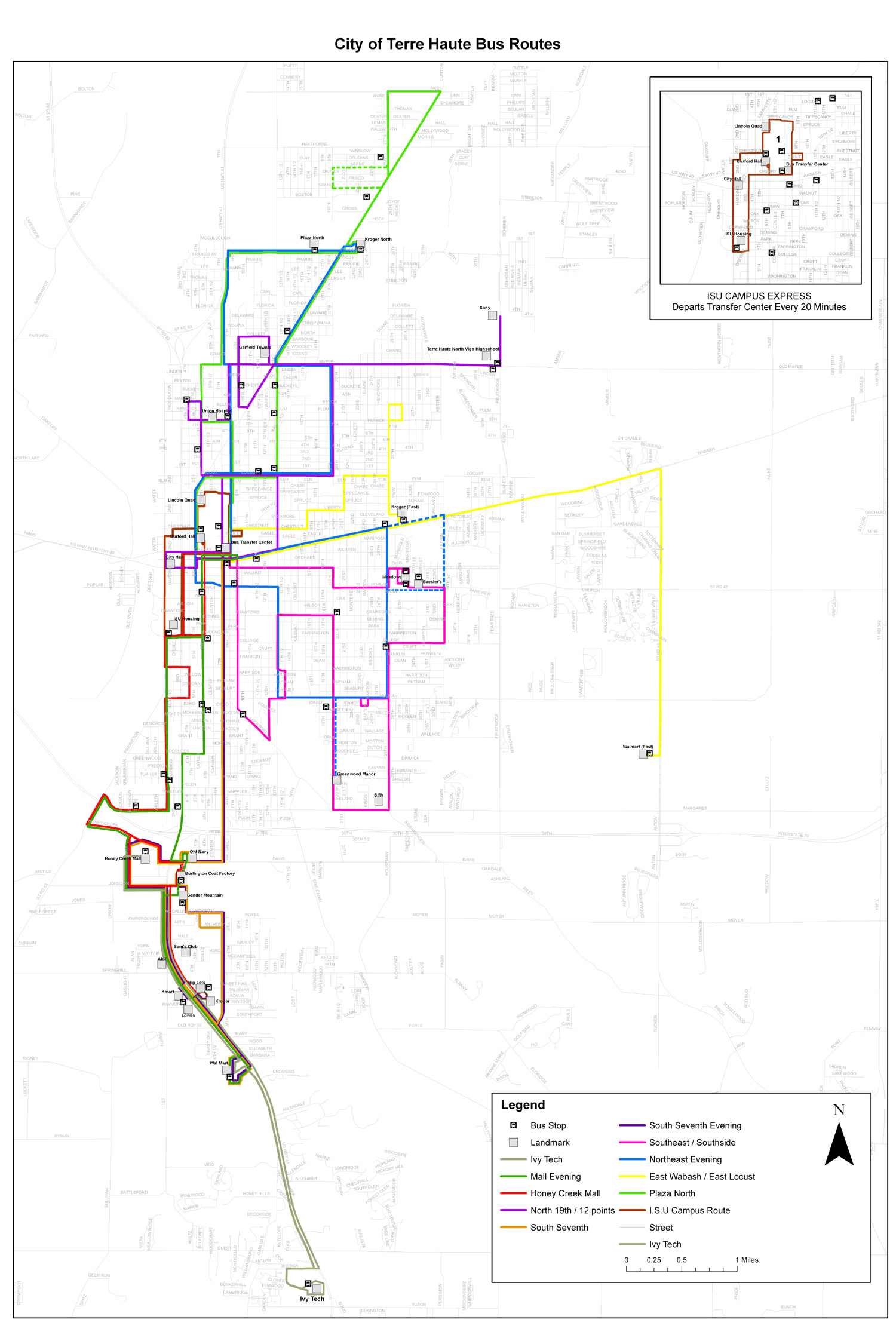

The city began operating bus service in 1964.

=== Bus routes ===
==== Day ====
- East Wabash/East Locust
- Honey Creek Mall
- North 19th/12 Points
- Plaza North
- South 7th
- Southeast/Southside

==== Evening ====
- Northeast
- Honey Creek Mall
- South 7th

==== Campus ====
- ISU Campus Route
- Ivy Tech CampusTransit

=== Paratransit ===
Wheels to the World provides service to ADA qualified passengers during regular operating hours.

== Fares and passes ==
The municipal buses can be used free of charge from January 2, 2025.

=== Fares ===
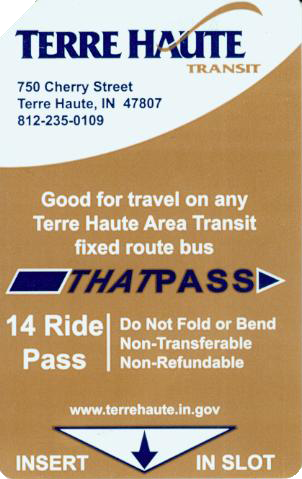
14 Ride Pass

Regular: $1.75 - Children 5 & under ride free when accompanied by an adult.
Reduced: $.75 - for Senior Citizens/Disabled/Medicare Card Holders (ID Required) from 9:15am – 3:15pm & 7:00pm – 11:00pm

=== Passes ===
14-Ride Pass: $18.00 is available from the driver or at the Transit Office.
31-Day Pass: $40.00 - Unlimited rides for 31 days from the activation date. Available at the Transit Office at the new Multi-Modal Parking Garage.

=== Campus agreements ===
Indiana State University students, faculty and staff are able to ride the bus for free by showing their university ID. This is a result of a contract with the university where it pays the transit utility $110,000 per semester, which is matched with federal transit funds.
Ivy Tech students and staff have the choice to ride the Terre Haute City Bus as well as the CampusTransit Shuttle Bus at no charge by showing a valid Ivy Tech ID.

== Fleet ==
Terre Haute transit uses a number of "Paratransit" vehicles manufactured by StarTrans. Fleet numbers range from 30 to 42 and a StarTrans Replica Trolley. Their fleet also includes two Azure Citibuses, hybrid type vehicles, that were entered service in May 2010.

== Transfer center ==
The bus transfer center, located at 8th and Cherry streets, serves as the primary transfer point for Terre Haute Transit buses. The facility is located on the ground level of a parking garage constructed in 2008. The facility is also served by Greyhound Lines buses.

== Fixed route ridership ==
The ridership statistics shown here are of fixed route services only and do not include demand response services.

== See also ==
- List of bus transit systems in the United States
- Bloomington Transit
- Terre Haute station
