= Tahoe Truckee Area Regional Transit =

Mass transportation agency

- Parent: Placer County
- Founded: 1975
- Headquarters: 870 Cabin Creek Road
- Locale: Truckee, California
- Service area: Lake Tahoe vicinity
- Service type: bus service, paratransit
- Routes: 4
- Destinations: Truckee, Incline Village, Tahoma
- Website: Tahoe Truckee Area Regional Transit

The Tahoe Truckee Area Regional Transit (TART) is the primary provider of mass transportation in the north shore Lake Tahoe region of north central California and northwestern Nevada.

TART is partially funded by RTC Washoe.

== History ==
In 2021 as a way to reduce traffic, TART began to offer a free on demand transit shuttle called TART Connect.

In 2023, TART ordered its first four electric buses as part of their zero emissions fleet program.
