= Obaseki =

Obaseki is an Edo-language Nigerian surname. Notable people with this surname include:

- Agho Obaseki (died 1920), Benin leader
- Andrews Otutu Obaseki (1926–2017), Nigerian jurist
- Darlington Obaseki (born 1968), Nigerian professor
- Gaius Obaseki, Nigerian politician
- Godwin Obaseki (born 1957), Nigerian politician
- Matilda Obaseki, Nigerian actress
