= Fare capping =

Public transport fare policy

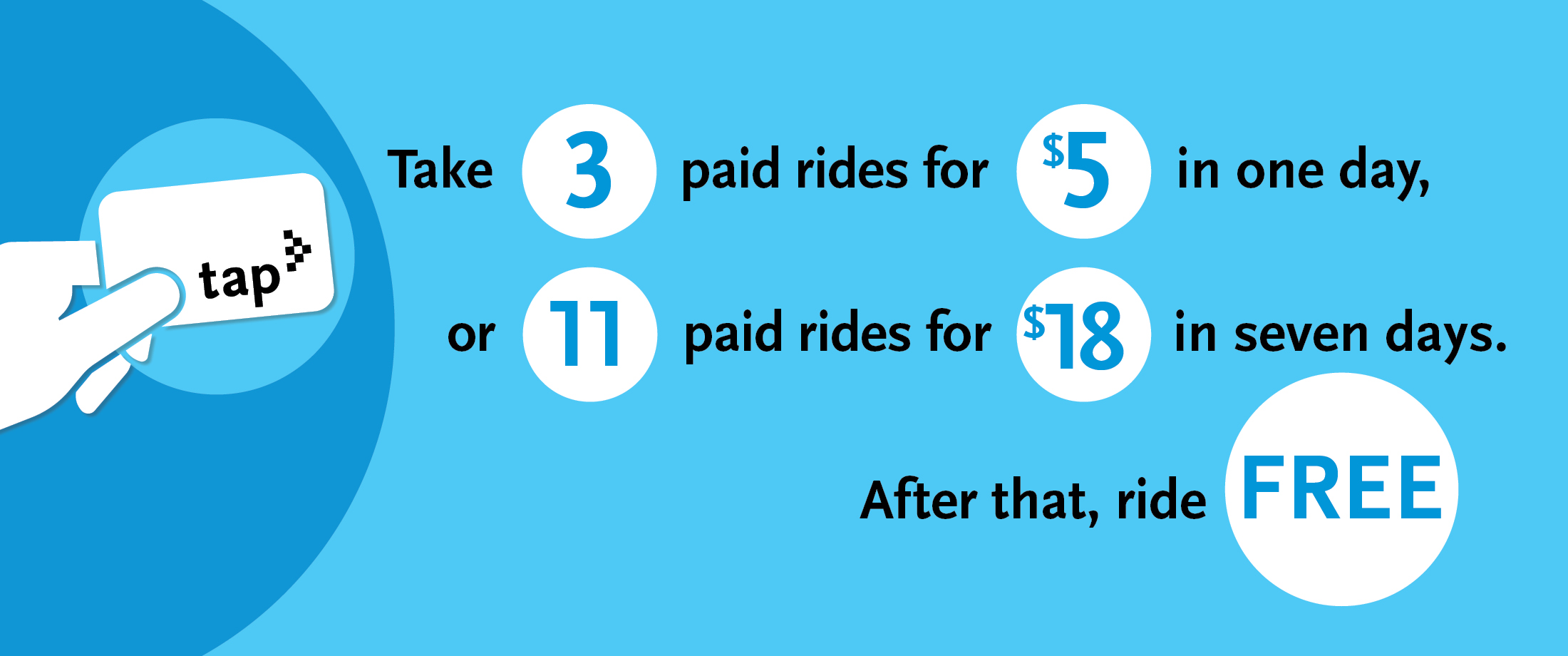
Advertisement for fare capping on the Los Angeles Metro system, beginning in July 2023

Fare capping is a feature of public transport fare collection systems, which allows passengers to earn an unlimited-ride pass by paying single-ride fares. Typically, passengers pay a single-ride fare each time they use public transport, using a smart card or, in some cases, their own credit or debit card. An automated fare collection system tracks the payments, and awards the passenger an unlimited-ride pass after they have paid the equivalent value in single-ride fares.

Some trials and proposals of fare capping were conducted in the early 2000s, with the first large implementation in London in 2005. Limited numbers of large transport operators began introducing fare capping in the 2010s, using proprietary technologies. As of 2023, fare capping is being implemented by smaller transport operators, using widely-available technology, with back-end systems in the cloud.

== Concept ==
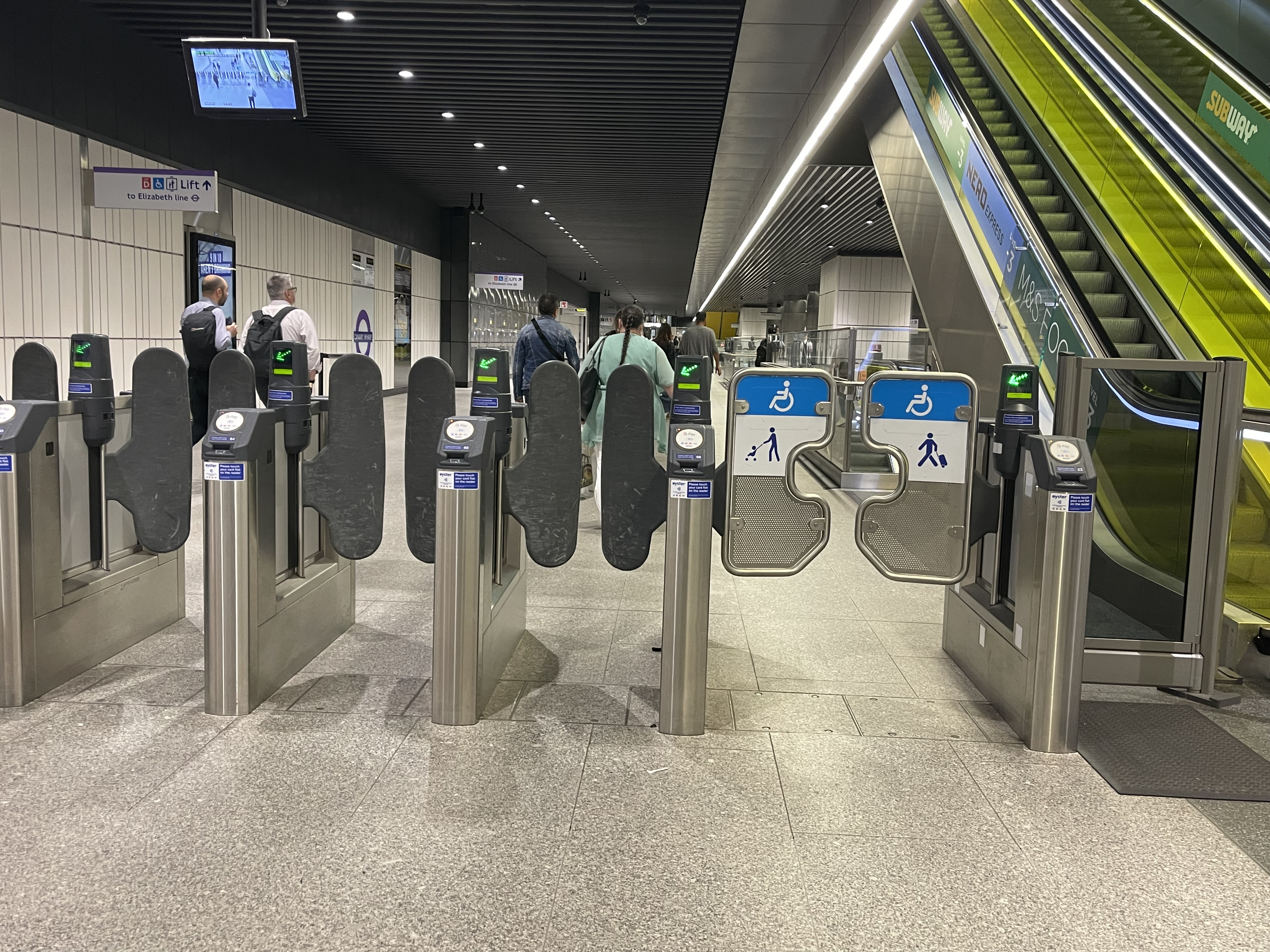
Oyster card readers on ticket barriers at Canary Wharf railway station, London. Transport for London introduced fare capping for Oyster card users in 2005.

Fare capping enables public transport passengers to pay the lowest possible fare for their trips over a period of time. Passengers pay a single-ride fare for each trip they take. Depending on the public transport system, this may be with a proprietary stored-value card, or passengers may use their own credit or debit card. The passenger pays the full fare for each trip within a period, such as a day or a week, until a certain threshold is met. This threshold may be a certain number of trips, or a monetary value. After the threshold is met, all rides for the rest of the period are free or discounted. This cap is often equivalent to the price of the comparable unlimited pass.

Fare capping is often presented in contrast to unlimited-ride passes, which are offered by many transport operators. Passes are favored by commuters and other frequent public transport users, who benefit from having unlimited access to public transport services. Infrequent users of public transport services may not know if they will ride enough to need a pass, and some frequent riders may not be able to afford the upfront cost.

Fare capping eliminates the need to purchase passes in advance, and offers passengers the best price on their trips regardless of how often they ride. This benefits infrequent passengers, who may be incentivized to make more trips using public transport because they will always pay the lowest price. Fare capping also benefits transport operators, who can simplify the way they sell tickets and passes.

== History ==
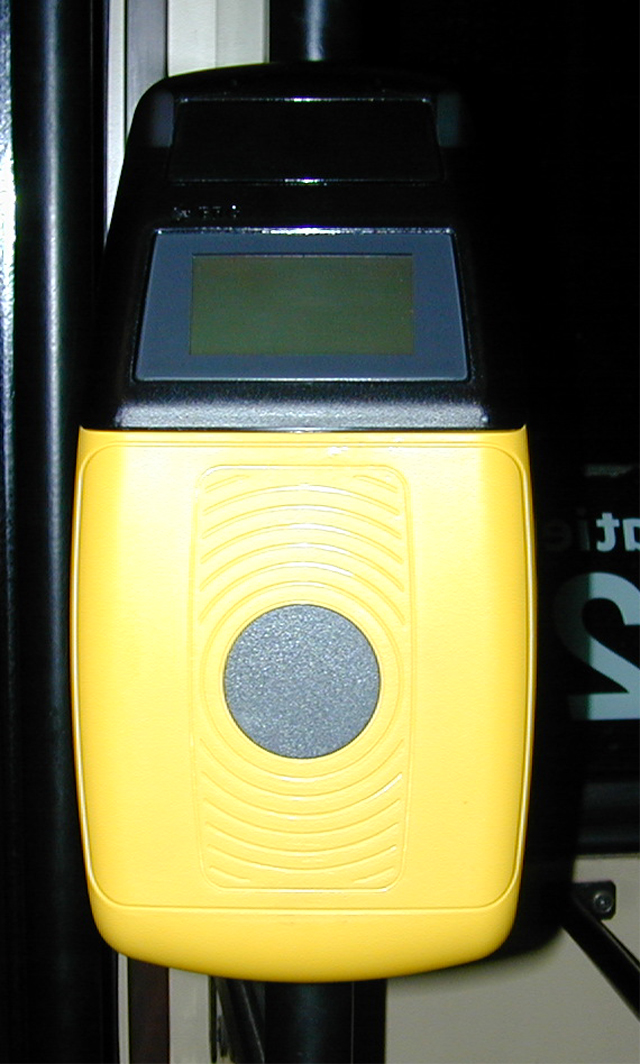
Card reader for the short-lived Tripperpas system in Groningen

An early implementation of fare capping was launched in 2000 in Groningen, the Netherlands, on Arriva buses. The Tripperpas used contactless smart card technology from Motorola and ERG Group, and introduced a number of new features. The Tripperpas was set up as a line of credit, where passengers were billed for the rides they took at the end of every month. Fare capping on the Tripperpas was advertised as the "best price guarantee," billing passengers for only up to the cost of the equivalent Sterabonnement season ticket.

At the conclusion of its 2-year trial, the Tripperpas system was shut down, with only 4,000 cards in use, of the 11,000 cards planned to be issued. The fare capping feature was not advertised well, and some passengers believed that fares would actually be higher than the single-ride Strippenkaart tickets that the system sought to replace. The successor to the Strippenkaart and Sterabonnement tickets, the OV-chipkaart, was introduced in 2005 without fare capping.

The Washington Metropolitan Area Transit Authority in Washington, D.C. proposed a fare capping program in 2003, shortly after the introduction of the SmarTrip fare card. WMATA concluded that it could implement fare capping on Metrobus services, which charge a flat fare, but that the distance-based fares of the Washington Metro posed a larger challenge. The technology and marketing for Washington Metro fare capping were both deemed to be too complex, and the proposal was abandoned.

The first large-scale implementation of fare capping was in 2005, by Transport for London. At its introduction, fare capping in London was available for Oyster card users only, and was valid on local services including the Underground and buses. The price cap for Oyster card users was set at the price of an equivalent one-day, unlimited-ride Travelcard. TfL has expanded its fare capping system since its introduction, adding 7-day caps and contactless bank card support in 2014.

Another early implementation of fare capping in Europe is in Dublin, starting in 2012. The Dublin fare capping system, using the TFI Leap Card, was expanded to the entire Dublin transport network beginning in 2013. Trips on Dublin Bus, Luas, and Iarnród Éireann services are covered.

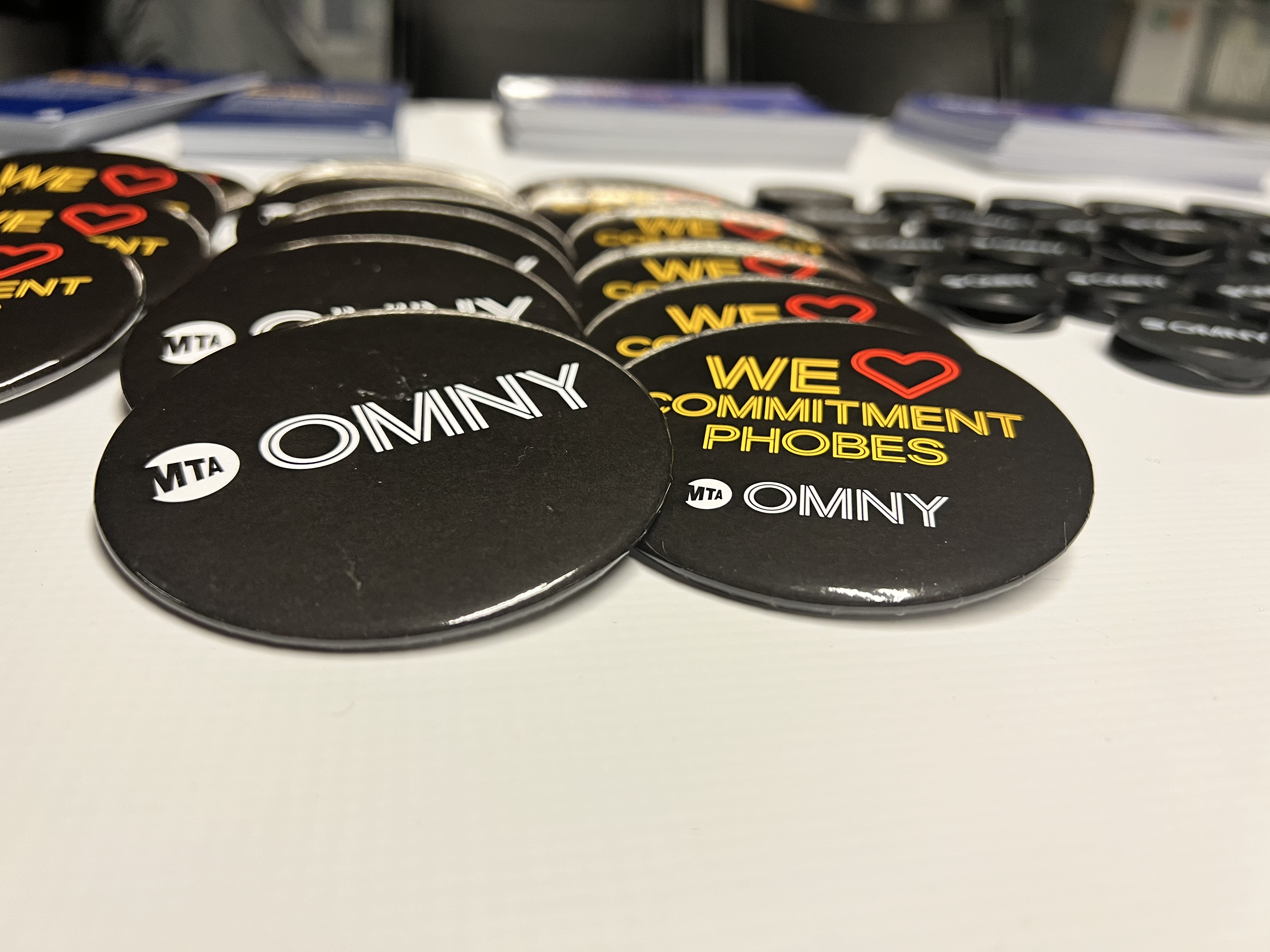
Literature on the New York City Subway promoting fare capping with OMNY, making a humorous comparison between fare capping users and "commitment phobes"

In the United States, two early examples are AC Transit and the Santa Clara Valley Transportation Authority, both in the San Francisco Bay Area, in 2012 and 2014 respectively. AC Transit and VTA operate in the same region, and both use the Clipper card, but their fares and fare caps are separate.

In the early 2020s, fare capping has been introduced by the two largest transit agencies in the United States by ridership, the New York MTA and Los Angeles Metro. In New York, a weekly fare cap is available for OMNY and contactless bank card users, for trips on the Subway and most MTA buses. In Los Angeles, a daily and weekly fare cap is available exclusively for TAP card users on Metro Bus and Metro Rail services.

== Technology ==
Fare capping takes advantage of the advanced capabilities of automated fare collection systems. Since the first major implementation of fare capping in London in 2005, technology has matured significantly, leading to reduced costs. This maturity has allowed the expansion of fare capping to smaller operators, using mobile apps in addition to contactless smart cards.

The Oyster card, the first major implementation of fare capping, uses MIFARE smart cards with proprietary programming. The with equipment connected to proprietary back-office systems. The Oyster card began to support fare capping in 2005, 7 years after the system's initial design began in 1998.

In contrast, contemporary payment systems that support fare capping are available as commercial off-the-shelf systems. These systems provide multiple components of an integrated fare payment system, including mobile apps, smart cards, card readers, and payment processing services. Multiple vendors provide these types of systems as white-label products, which have the transport operator's own branding applied. Examples of such systems include Umo by Cubic Transportation Systems, Justride by Masabi, and MOBILEvario by INIT.

An example of this technology's maturity is the installation of a new fare system on the Milwaukee County Transit System in Wisconsin, USA. The WisGo payment system, powered by Cubic's Umo, was implemented in under two years, despite delays.

== Impacts ==
Fare capping is frequently cited as a method to improve the social equity of transport fares. A 2022 poll of United States transport operators concluded that in addition to improving equity in transit fares, fare capping can also reduce transport operators' expenses in handling cash, and can contribute to an easier experience for passengers.

Fares, and fare capping, can be used by transport operators to influence their passengers' behavior, and therefore the ridership of their services. A 2020 behavioral economics analysis in Vancouver, British Columbia argued that transport operators must carefully consider their messaging around fare capping, as it can have significant positive or negative impacts on behavior.
