= EBS =

EBS may refer to:

== Broadcasting ==
- EBS TV (Ethiopia)
- Educational Broadband Service, US TV service
- Educational Broadcasting System, a South Korean broadcaster
- Emergency Broadcast System, former US Warning system
- Europe by Satellite, the EU TV information service
- Edo Broadcasting Service, a broadcaster in Edo State, Nigeria

== Computing ==
- Amazon Elastic Block Store, a cloud storage system
- Erase Block Summary of the JFFS2 filesystem
- Oracle E-Business Suite

== Education ==
- EBS University of Business and Law, in Wiesbaden, Germany
- Edinburgh Business School, of Heriot-Watt University, Edinburgh, Scotland
- El Nasr Boys' School, Alexandria, Egypt
- Estonian Business School, in Tallinn, Estonia
- European Business School (disambiguation)
- East Barnet School, Academy in East Barnet, London

== Finance and commerce ==
- E-Billing Solutions, an Indian company, now part of Ingenico
- Egged Bus Services, a Dutch subsidiary of Israeli company Egged
- EBS d.a.c., a financial institution in Ireland
- Electronic Broking Services, a foreign-exchange platform
- Erste Group, an Austrian financial service provider in Central and Eastern Europe
- European Banking Supervision, a system of prudential supervision of euro area banks

== Technology ==
- Elastic backscattering spectrometry
- Electrical brain stimulation
- Electronic Braking System
- Ethylene bis(stearamide)

== Other uses ==
- Ebisu Station (Tokyo), JR East station code
- Elder of the Order of the Burning Spear, an honour bestowed by the President of Kenya
- Electric Bond and Share Company, US
- Epidermolysis bullosa simplex, a disease
- Evolutionary Behavioral Sciences, a journal
- Webster City Municipal Airport, Iowa, US, IATA code
- Evidence-based scheduling
