= Humphrey Omo-Osagie =

Chief Humphrey Omo-Osagie

Iyase of Benin
- Preceded by: Gaius Obaseki

Member of the House of Representatives
- In office 1954–1960

Parliamentary Secretary, Ministry of Finance
- In office 1955–1959

Member of the Mid-Western Region House of Assembly
- Incumbent
- Assumed office 1963

Personal details
- Occupation: Politician, civil servant
- Known for: Leadership of Otu-Edo

Chief Humphrey Omo-Osagie was a Nigeria politician and Benin chief who held the title of Iyase of Benin. As Iyase, he was the prime minister in the court of the Oba of Benin, in addition, his strong support of Oba Akenzua II in the early 1950s created his alias B-2, or Benin authentic number 2, a mockery of Gaius Obaseki who was then Iyase. From 1963 to 1966, Omo-Osagie was influential in the administration of Dennis Osadebay, Premier of the Mid-Western region, he had a close relationship with Festus Okotie Eboh and his political group was influential in Benin division during the 1960s.

He led a pro-Benin monarchy group called Otu-Edo but cultivated an antagonistic attitude towards his opponents and was at times strong willed in his commitment to Otu-Edo causes.

== Life ==
Omo-Osagie was born in Iyekuselu quarters of Benin, his father was a grandson of Iyase N'Ohenmwen. He was educated at King's College, Lagos, completing studies in 1919. Thereafter, he joined the sanitary department as inspector, he worked in the colonial civil service from 1919 to 1945. As a civil servant, he joined Herbert Macaulay's NNDP and later joined the Nigerian Youth Movement after its founding in 1934. Upon retirement, he was nominated to represent his constituency in the new regional House of Chiefs in 1946. Omo-Osagie was soon influenced by the political aspiration of Gaius Obaseki, the Iyase of Benin who was in the process of whittling down the influence of the traditional authority in Benin, the Oba of Benin, Akenzua II. Omo-Osagie sided with the traditionalists and joined Otu-Edo, a political group in support of the Oba that was growing in popularity. He was a longtime president of the association. In the local Benin election of 1951, he led Otu-Edo's alliance with NCNC to victory over Obaseki's Action Group; he also became a member of the regional House of Assembly. In 1954, he was elected House of Representative member from Benin and re-elected in 1959. From 1955 to 1959, he was Parliamentary Secretary in the Ministry of Finance where he developed a relationship with Festus Okotie-Eboh. After the Mid-western region was created, Omo-Osagie served as an interim deputy administrator and then parliamentarian in the regional House of Assembly.

Omo-Osagie's leadership of Otu-Edo coincided with the rise of Owegbe, a secret cult aligned with Otu-Edo's objectives, the secret society grew in numbers in the aftermath of Obaseki's headship of both the Benin Divisional Council and the Benin lodge of the Reformed Ogboni from 1948 to 1951. Obaseki was perceived to have created a privileged class of Ogboni members who had access to government employment and near monopoly of contracts. Ogboni rivals soon congregated under Owegbe Society as an antidote and protection from alleged abuse of power by Ogboni members who were accused of using intimidation and blackmail tactics and also abusing tax powers by placing high tax burden placed on opponents. Members of the Owegbe created a ritual initiation process for members to tie their allegiance to the society and Otu-Edo. The society encouraged members to use herbs as medicine and for protection. After the victory of Otu-Edo in 1951 election, the society grew and became an important political mobilization tool of the party. In 1959, the opposition party which controlled the regional government banned the society, sensing its political importance to Otu-Edo's victories in Benin division in the 1950s.
