= OVpay =

Payment system for public transport in the Netherlands

- Location: The Netherlands
- Operator: Translink (Netherlands)
- Manager: OVpay is a collaboration between Translink, all major Dutch banks, and Dutch public transport operators: Arriva, EBS, GVB, HTM, Keolis, NS, Qbuzz, RET, and Transdev.
- Currency: Euro
- Website: ovpay.nl/en

OVpay is a payment and integrated ticketing system for public transport in the Netherlands, currently only for journeys at the full OV-chipkaart fare.

With its national rollout completed in June 2023, OVpay made the Netherlands the first country in the world to launch a fully contactless open-loop public transport payment system on a nationwide basis. Mastercard partnered with Translink and the Dutch public transport companies to implement the system, supporting local banks with mobility transaction processing rules and ensuring the necessary software updates across the network.

OVpay was first piloted in March 2021 in Lelystad, before a broader rollout in mid-2022. Nationwide coverage was achieved in June 2023, when all public transport across the Netherlands including trains, buses, metros and trams, began accepting check-in and check-out by debit card, credit card, smartphone or smartwatch. The system is complementary to the OV smart card system. In March 2024, OVpay received the Best Smart Ticketing Programme award (200,000+ daily journeys category) at the Transport Ticketing Global 2024 conference in London.

The OV-chipkaart is being phased out and will be discontinued by the end of 2027, replaced by the OV-pas, a new smart card operating under the OVpay system. Unlike the OV-chipkaart, which stores data on the card itself, the OV-pas keeps information in an online account, and can also be added digitally to a smartphone.
