= Philip Igbafe =

Nigerian historian and professor

Professor Philip Igbafe
- Born: December 15, 1936; Uzairue, Etsako West Local Government Area of Edo State
- Died: April 26, 2021 (aged 84); Benin City
- Board member of: University of Benin Teaching Hospital (1980–1983)

Academic background
- Education: University of Ibadan

Academic work
- Main interests: History of Edo people of the precolonial Kingdom of Benin

Philip Aigbona Igbafe (15 December 1936 – 26 April 2021) was a Nigerian historian, professor and public administrator noted for his work on the history of the Edo people of the precolonial Kingdom of Benin. He belonged to the Ibadan History School and his major works examine the motives for colonialism and highlight the political, social and economic consequences of British rule for the African kingdom.

== Early life and education ==
Igbafe was born in Uzairue, part of the Etsako West local government area of Edo State in midwestern Nigeria. He started his education at St. Peter's Catholic Central School, Uzairue from 1943 to 1949, secondary education at St. Thomas's Teachers Training College in Ibusa from 1950 to 1954 when he qualified as a Teacher Grade 2. He then started his teaching career, first as a tutor in Catholic School, Abraka from January 1955 to July 1955, moving on to teach at St. Thomas's College, Ibusa from July 1955 to March 1958. He also taught briefly at the Western Boys High School, Benin City in 1958 before gaining admission and a federal government scholarship to study history at the University of Ibadan.

He graduated from the University of Ibadan in 1961 with a Bachelor of Arts in history and worked briefly in the federal civil service before returning for graduate studies at the University of Ibadan. At the University of Ibadan he came under the influence of the famous Ibadan School of History – dominated by scholars like J.D. Omer-Cooper, J.C. Anene, J.F. Ade Ajayi and K.O. Dike – which approaches African history with emphasis on ancient civilizations and politics of its people, rather than the Euro-centric model of African history only in terms of European involvement in the continent. Among his contemporaries were Obaro Ikime and Adiele Afigbo, and together they went on to pioneer the "made in Nigeria PhDs" that were founded on research on Nigerian history with his work focusing on the political, economic and cultural development of the ancient kingdom of Benin and its economic and diplomatic relations with European powers.

He obtained his PhD in 1968 and became a foremost authority on major aspects of Nigerian history, especially the history of the Benin and Edo people, researching, writing and publishing several works that not only laid the groundwork for current and future scholars in the field but continue to be the unrivaled source in Africa's historiography. He was honored in 2011 with Nigeria's Member of the Order of the Federal Republic award.

== Career ==
Igbafe was appointed an assistant lecturer at the University of Ife (now Obafemi Awolowo University) in July 1964 where he taught in the department of history and rose through the academic ladder, becoming lecturer in October 1967 and senior lecturer in October 1971. He was also a member of the university's governing council (elected by Congregation) from November 1970 to November 1972, a senior fellow or deputy hall master at the university's Fajuyi Hall from 1968 to 1969 and hall master, Temporary Hostels (later named Obafemi Awolowo Hall) from 1969 to 1975.

In November 1975, he was invited into government in the then Bendel State of Nigeria under military governor George Agbazika Innih to serve as the Commissioner for Works and Transport, moving onto the role of Commissioner for Chieftaincy Affairs and Culture in June 1976. On completion of public service in April 1978, he returned to the university and was appointed professor of history at the University of Benin.

At the University of Benin, he was a member of the governing council twice from 1980 to 1984 and from 1988 to 1992, twice the head of department of history in 1978–1982 and 1986–1989, twice the dean of arts in 1982–1986 and 2000–2001. He was also a member of the University of Benin Teaching Hospital Management Board (representing the Vice-Chancellor) from 1980 to 1983 and chairman, University of Benin Press in 1984–1985.

He continued to research, write, teach and supervise undergraduate, graduate and doctoral candidates at the university of Benin until December 2006 when he retired at the age 70. Not done with imparting knowledge and doing research he accepted to continue teaching and research work when he was invited to join Benson Idahosa University as a professor of international studies and diplomacy in October 2007.

Away from academics, he made contributions to public service at national level. He was elected a delegate to the Nigerian National Constitutional Conference of 1994–1995 where he was a member of the publications committee while also chairing the committee on power sharing. His other public roles include serving as chairman of the board of directors of the Bendel Broadcasting Service (Edo Broadcasting Service) from July 1978 to October 1979 and as chairman of the board of directors of the state-owned Ethiope Publishing Corporation from 1991 to 1992.

=== History ===
As a foremost authority on major aspects of Nigerian history, especially the history of the Benin and Edo people, his works not only laid the groundwork for current and future scholars in the field but continue to be the unrivaled source in Africa's historiography. Over a period of 40 years he supervised hundreds of undergraduate, post graduate and doctoral research and thesis projects, wrote several books, contributed chapters to books on Nigeria history in addition to articles in several scholarly and peer-reviewed journals published both in Nigeria and around the world.

His major contribution to Nigerian history covers the economic impact of British rule in Benin, the biography of Agho Obaseki of Benin, the socio-economic foundations of the Kingdom of Benin, Nigerian colonial experience and the history of the Etsako people of Edo state of Nigeria. His most outstanding and seminal works include Benin under British administration, 1897–1938 : the impact of colonial rule on an African kingdom, and The nemesis of power: Agho Obaseki and Benin politics, 1897–1956.

== Publications ==
- Obaseki of Benin. African historical biographies. Vol. 5. London: Heinemann Educational Books. 1972. ISBN 978-0-435-94469-8. LCCN 74183757.
  - Fines, John (May 1973). Teaching History (Review). 3 (9): 63–64. JSTOR 43252266.
- Benin under British Administration: The Impact of Colonial Rule on an African Kingdom, 1897–1938. 1979.
  - Jones, G. I. (1980). The International Journal of African Historical Studies (Review). 13 (3): 559–561. doi:10.2307/218965. JSTOR 218965. S2CID 142964523.
  - Wandera, Steve (1980). Transafrican Journal of History (Review). 9 (1/2): 240–242. JSTOR 24328561.
  - Cornevin, Robert (1980). "Igbafe (Philip A.) : Benin under British Administration. The Impact of Colonial Rule on an African Kingdom, 1897-1938". Outre-Mers. Revue d'histoire (Review) (in French). 67 (246): 179–180. S2CID 131475879.
  - Davis, Thomas J. (February 1981). The History Teacher (Review). 14 (2): 287–288. doi:10.2307/493299. JSTOR 493299.
  - Herskovits, Jean (December 1981). The American Historical Review (Review). 86 (5): 1127–1128. doi:10.2307/1858616. JSTOR 1858616.
  - Afigbo, A. E. (January 1982). "Review: Colonial Administration in Benin". The Journal of African History (Review). 23 (1): 136–138. doi:10.1017/S0021853700020387. JSTOR 181285. S2CID 163130453.
- The Nemesis of Power: Agho Obaseki and Benin Politics 1897–1956. Macmillan Nigeria. 1991. ISBN 978-978-132-991-3.
  - Revised 2016 (Mindex Publishing Company, Benin City), 2016.
- Profiles: Citations on some Eminent Personalities. Benin City: Mindex Publishing Company. 2016. ISBN 978-978-8515-82-1.
