= Studentenreisproduct =

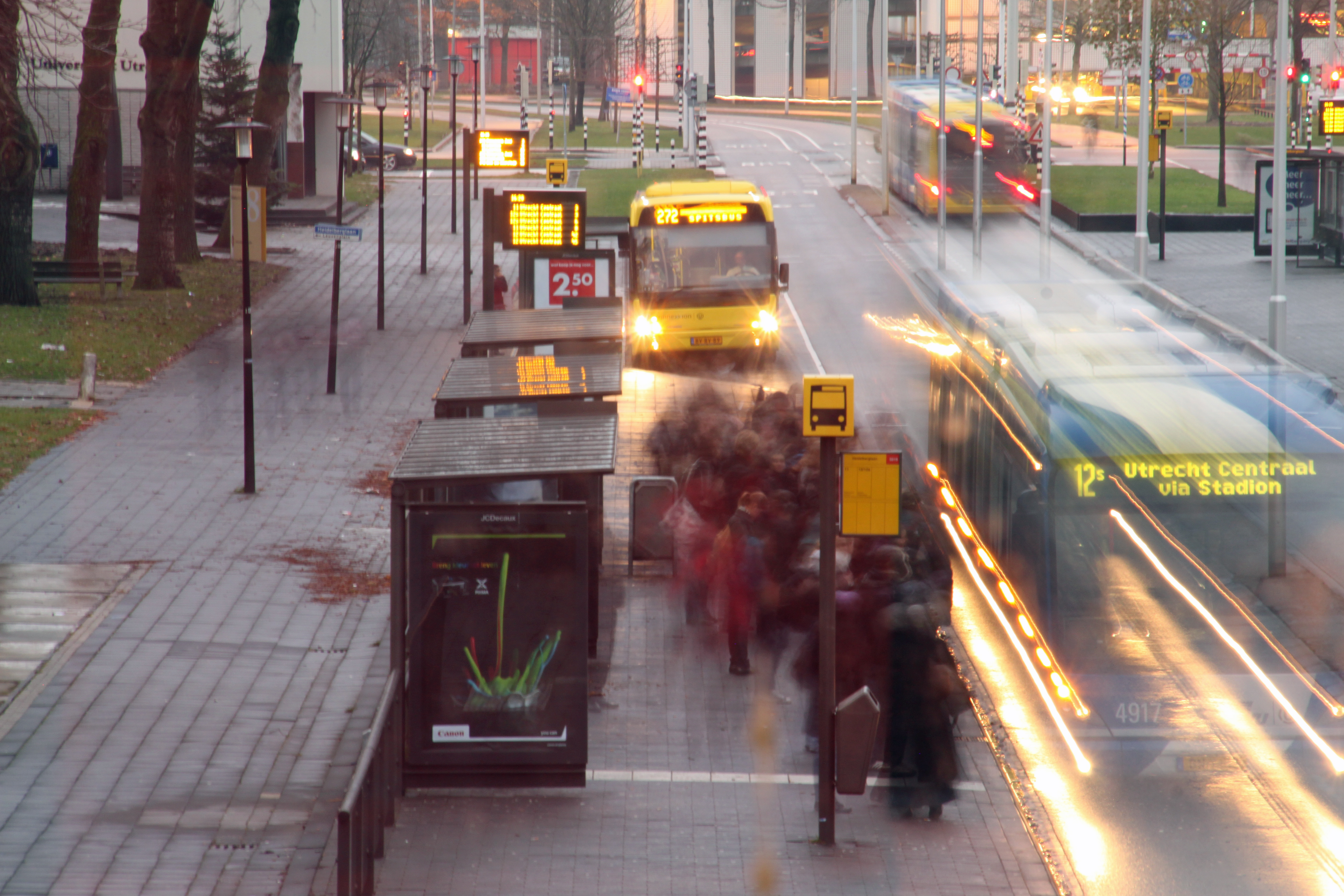
Passengers boarding a bus on Uithof campus. A majority of the passengers here travel with the free Studentenreisproduct.

The Studentenreisproduct is a form of free public transport for students in the Netherlands. Introduced in 1991, the system is a solution for students who do not live near their university or college. The central government intends for this to stimulate teenagers in the development of their education.

Studentenreisproduct is loaded as a product on the OV-chipkaart, a contactless travel card.

Students can choose either free transport on weekdays and a 40% discount on the weekend, or vice versa.

	Weekly	Weekend
Monday	Discount until 04:00, then free	Free until 04:00, Discount afterwards
Tuesday	Free	Discount from 9:00
Wednesday	Free	Discount from 9:00
Thursday	Free	Discount from 9:00
Friday	Free	Discount from 9:00
Saturday	Free until 04:00	Free
Sunday	Discount	Free
Summer*	Discount	As in the rest of the year
Holidays**	Discount from 16:00 hrs until 16:00 hrs the next day	Free from 16:00 hrs to 16:00 hrs the next day
Good Friday	Free	Free

*July 16 16:00 hrs until August 16 16:00 hrs

**Like Friday on the day before Good Friday, before King's Day, before Liberation Day, and before Ascension
