= Dennis Osadebay =

Nigerian politician

President of the Senate of Nigeria
- In office 1 October 1960 – 1 October 1963
- Preceded by: Nnamdi Azikiwe
- Succeeded by: Nwafor Orizu

Premier of Mid-Western Region
- In office 1964–1966
- Preceded by: Position established
- Succeeded by: David Ejoor

Personal details
- Born: 29 June 1911 Asaba, Southern Nigeria Protectorate
- Died: 26 December 1994 (aged 83) Asaba
- Party: National Council of Nigeria and the Cameroons
- Profession: Lawyer

Dennis Chukude Osadebay (29 June 1911 — 26 December 1994) was a Nigerian politician, poet, journalist and former premier of the now defunct Mid-Western Region of Nigeria, which now comprises Edo State and Delta State. He was one of the pioneering Nigerian poets who wrote in English.

As a politician, he was said to have detest for party politics and tried to form unbiased opinions on important matters of the period. He was also a leader of the movement to create a Mid-Western region during the Nigerian First Republic.

== Biography ==
=== Early life and poems ===
He was born in Asaba, Delta State, to parents of mixed cultural backgrounds. He attended Asaba Government School at Asaba, the Sacred Heart School in Calabar and Hope Waddell Training Institute. He joined the labour force in 1930 as a customs officer working in Lagos, Port Harcourt and Calabar. He subsequently went to England to study Law during the 1940s. It was while studying that he started publishing poetic verses. He was then known as a newspaper poet, as most of his writings were published in the West African Pilot and a few other newspapers. In his writings, Osadebay used both his personal life and public events as inspiration. In Africa Sings, a collection of poems, he delved into themes from a personal point of view, such as a sullen poem written about his 25th birthday and the coming of middle age. However, his best work in the volume were poems written from an impersonal viewpoint. In his adventurous poem "black man troubles", he used pidgin English to lament the status of black Africans in colonial Africa and injustice in the society. His poems were also notable for faithfully representing modern poetic rhythm.

=== Political career ===
Osadebay was one of the founding members of the National Council of Nigeria and the Cameroons (NCNC) in 1944. He left the country to read law a few years later. After, completing his studies, he returned to Nigeria and established a law practice in Aba and was also made the legal adviser of the NCNC. In 1951, he contested and won a seat on the Western Region House of Assembly, which was dominated by the rival Action Group (AG). He soon became the leader of opposition in the region from 1954 to 1956 but gave the mantle to Adegoke Adelabu in 1956. After the death of Adegoke Adelabu, he took on his familiar oppositional role in 1958. In 1960, he became the Speaker in the Western Region and upon the creation of the Mid-Western Region in 1963, became the pioneer premier of the newly created region.

=== Premier ===
1965 cabinet
Office	Name	1965 - 1966
Premier	Dennis Osadebay	
Finance	Ogoegnunam Dafe	
Works	Christopher Okojie	
Health	John Igbrude	
Agriculture	John Umolu	
Forestry and Natural Resources	V Amadasun	
Economic Development	James Otobo	
Education	F.H. Utomi	
Establishments	T.E.A. Salubi	
Internal Affairs	Shaka Momodu	
Attorney-General	Webber Egbe	
Labour and Social Welfare	E. Imafidon	
Lands and Housing	E.S. Ukonga	
Local Government	Humphrey Omo-Osagie	
Chieftaincy Affairs	G.I. Oviasu	
Industry	J.A. Orhoho	
Trade	O. Oweh	
Transport	L.S.T. Fufeyin	

Region	Period	Governor	Premier	Notes
Eastern Region	Oct 1960 - Jan 1966	Francis Akanu Ibiam	Michael Okpara	
Mid-Western Region	Aug 1963 - Feb 1964	Dennis Osadebay	Dennis Osadebay (Administrator)	Region created from part of Western Region on 8 August 1963
Mid-Western Region	Feb 1964 - Jan 1966	Jereton Mariere	Dennis Osadebay	
Northern Region	Oct 1960 - 1962	Gawain Westray Bell	Ahmadu Bello	
Northern Region	1962 - Jan 1966	Kashim Ibrahim	Ahmadu Bello	
Western Region	Oct 1960 - May 1962	Adesoji Aderemi	Samuel Ladoke Akintola	
Western Region	May 1962 - Dec 1962	Adesoji Aderemi	Moses Majekodunmi (Administrator)	Administrator appointed during political crisis
Western Region	Jan 1963 - Jan 1966	Joseph Fadahunsi	Samuel Akintola	
