= OV-chipkaart =

Dutch public transport card

- Location: The Netherlands
- Launched: 2005
- Technology: Infineon SLE 77
- Operator: Trans Link Systems
- Manager: NS, Connexxion, GVB, HTM and RET
- Currency: Euro (€4, €10 or €20 depending on travel mode minimum load, €150 maximum load)
- Stored-value: Travel on credit ('reizen op saldo') or travel product ('reisproduct')
- Auto recharge: Automatic reload ('automatisch opladen')
- Validity: All public transport on the Dutch mainland
- Retailed: Online; Railway and metro stations; On board (bus and tram only); Newsagents, supermarkets
- Website: OV-chipkaart.nl

The OV-chipkaart (Dutch pronunciation: [oːˈveː ˈtɕɪpkaːrt], short for openbaar vervoer chipkaart [ˈoːpə(m)baːr vərˈvuːr ˈtɕɪpkaːrt], meaning public transport chipcard) is a contactless smart card and integrated ticketing system used for all public transport in the Netherlands. First introduced in the Rotterdam Metro in April 2005, it has subsequently been rolled out to other areas and travel modes. It fully replaced the national strippenkaart system for buses, trams, and metro trains in 2011, and the paper ticket system for rail travel in July 2014.

The OV-chipkaart is available in disposable form (for occasional passengers, such as tourists) and reusable versions (for frequent travellers, either in anonymous or personalised forms).

In January 2026, Trans Link Systems announced that the OV-chipkaart will be fully discontinued by 2027. It will be replaced by the OV-pas, an updated smart card utilizing the newer OV-pay payment system which has been concurrently in use with the OV-chipkaart since 2022. With a gradual transition period in 2026 for upgrading OV-pay to support new features and travel products, the OV-chipkaart is expected to be fully discontinued by 2027.

== History and coverage ==
The OV-chipkaart is a collaborative initiative of five large public transport operators in the Netherlands: the main rail operator NS, the bus operator Connexxion and the municipal transport operators of the three largest cities: GVB (Amsterdam), HTM (The Hague) and RET (Rotterdam), though all public transport operators in the Netherlands now use the system. It is operated through a joint venture named Trans Link Systems (TLS).

The OV-chipkaart system was first implemented in the Rotterdam Metro in April 2005. The Amsterdam Metro followed suit in 2006 by accepting the card as an alternative method of payment. All trams and buses in Rotterdam accepted the OV-chipkaart from June 2007 onwards, and coverage in Amsterdam was extended to all trams and buses in November 2008. Traditional paper tickets and the OV-chipkaart were used concurrently in the Amsterdam and Rotterdam metropolitan areas until mid 2010, when the OV-chipkaart became the only valid fare system. Paper-based, single-use tickets and the national strippenkaart system were subsequently phased out throughout the country on an area-by-area basis. The strippenkaart system was formally abandoned in November 2011.

Within the national rail system, the principal rail operator Nederlandse Spoorwegen (NS) started implementing the OV-chipkaart for rail journeys in October 2009. Regional operators followed suit. Traditional paper tickets were finally abandoned in July 2014 for both NS and regional rail operators. Single or return tickets, used by incidental travellers and tourists, are still available at ticket machines and service counters, but are now loaded on a disposable OV-chipkaart which means that the ticket must be validated by "checking in" at a ticket barrier or card reader before boarding the train.

Since July 2014, the OV-chipkaart has become the only ticketing system in all public transport in the Netherlands, although the system has not been adopted on most of the Frisian Islands and in the Caribbean Netherlands. There are also other areas that aren't covered, such as some neighbourhood buses, on-demand buses and international trains.

== Travelling with the OV-chipkaart ==
The OV-chipkaart works in two ways: either as a stored-value card which is used to travel on pre-loaded credit (Dutch: reizen op saldo); or as a means of storing so-called "travel products" (Dutch: reisproducten) such as single or return rail tickets, day passes, seasonal tickets and discount plans.

=== Checking in and out ===
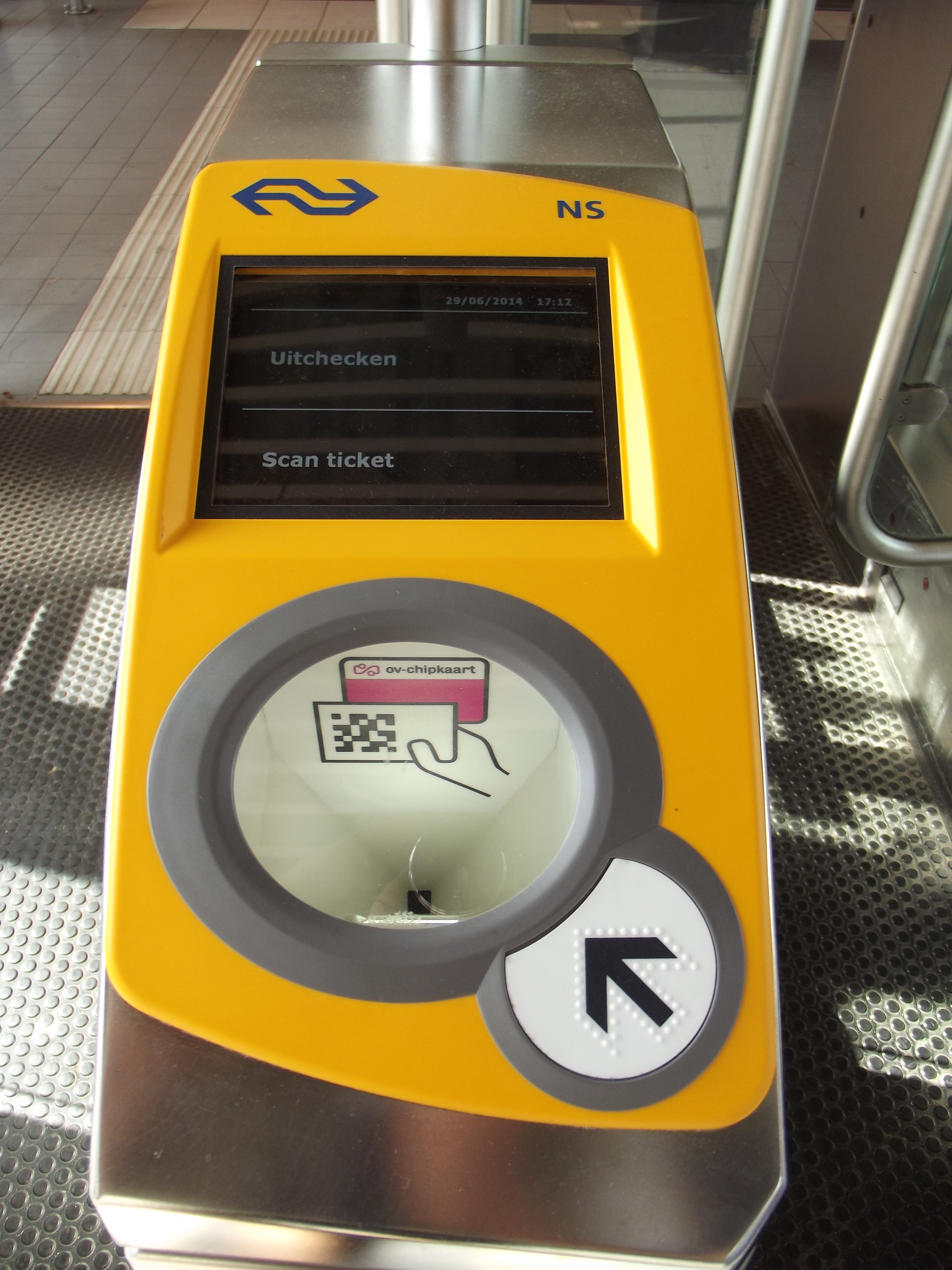
Panel on the right side of a ticket gate, with a small display above and a combination of a card reader and a barcode reader (for Aztec code) below.

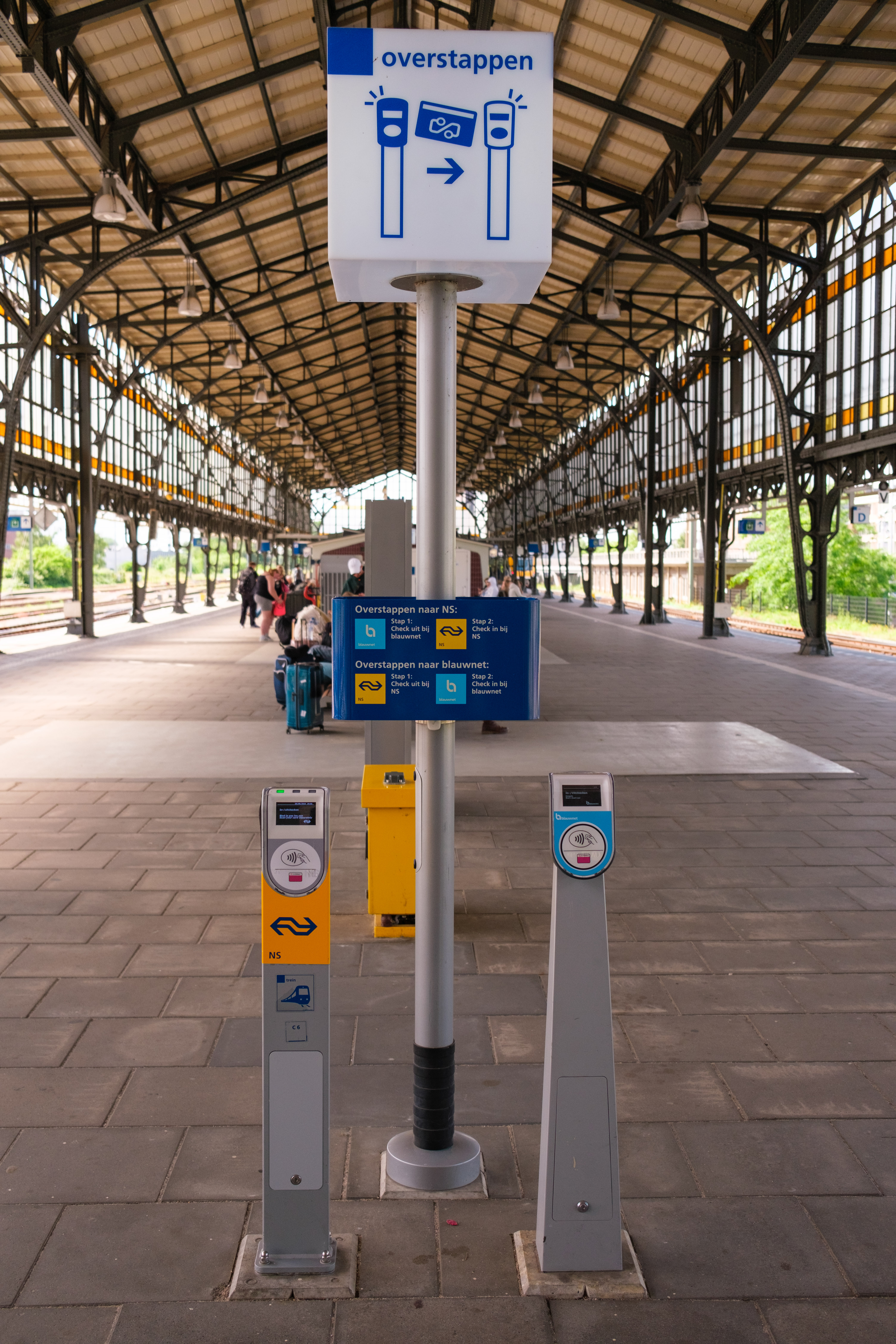
As all public transport operators use their own card readers for checking in and out, passenger transferring from one operator to another must first check out with the first operator and then check in with the second operator.

Passengers must "check in" at the beginning of their journey and "check out" at the end of the journey by scanning the card at an OV-chipkaart card reader. Card readers are placed at station entrances (metro and train) and on board vehicles (bus, tram, and light rail). A successful check-in is usually signaled with a green light and a short beep, while check-out also gives a green light and usually two short beeps.

When changing between most transport modes (e.g. from bus to bus, bus to tram, bus to train), the user has to check out when leaving the first vehicle and check in when entering the second vehicle. When transferring between trains from the same operator (e.g. from NS train to NS train), checking out and in is not necessary. But this is exceptional: for example, failing to check out and then in again when changing between trams will charge the user the whole deposit (currently €4) rather than the actual fare for their journey (further explained below).

When travelling on credit, a deposit is deducted from the card's credit balance upon checking in. The amount of the deposit is generally €4 for municipal bus, tram and metro journeys, and €6 for regional buses. For train journeys, the minimum deposit is €20, although with some discount plans loaded on the card, the deposit is only €10. Upon checking out, the deposit is automatically refunded to the card with the price of the journey deducted. The journey price consists of a basic fare plus a fare-per-kilometer. The basic fare is only calculated once per journey, which means that only the per-kilometer fare is calculated after transferring to another vehicle (provided that no more than 35 minutes have passed between checking out and in). Journey fares vary regionally and are determined periodically by regional transport boards.

The deposit is possible to be refunded if the user fails to check out at the end of the journey.

As this normally means that the user pays more than the quoted fare for a journey, the deposit system aims to determine misuse of the system. In the event of a machine failure (e.g. if all card validators are out of service), or if the user can prove the real journey, such as checking into a local bus after leaving the train, the excess fee paid can be claimed back from the transport operator.

The OV-chipkaart is not accepted for international travel; an international ticket must be purchased instead. For connecting local trips the card should still be used and must in this case be checked out when ending this trip. A few German stations have Dutch card readers that accept the OV-chipkaart.

=== Use on trains and metro trains ===
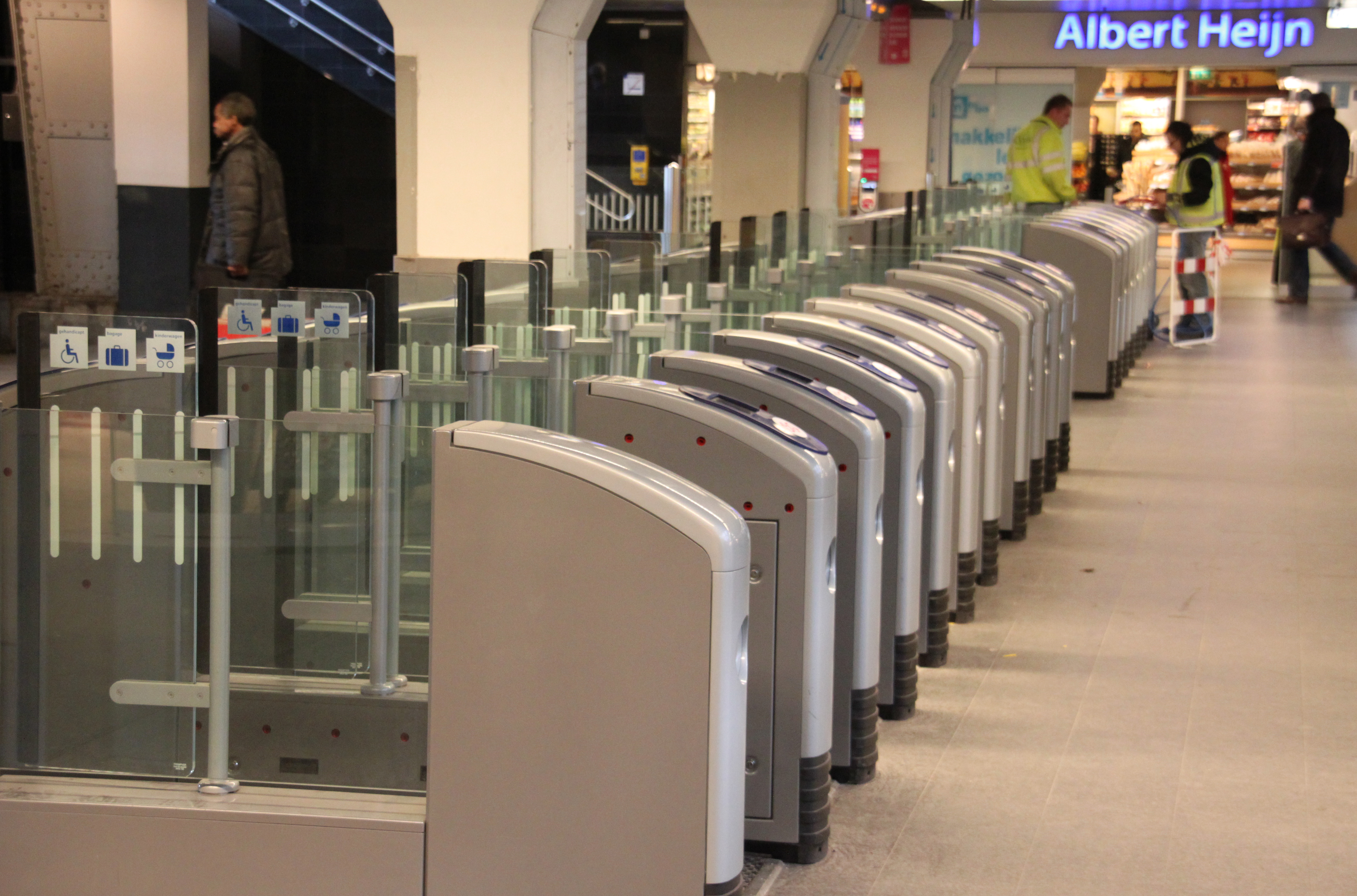
Ticket gates at Amsterdam Centraal station

Larger metro stations in Amsterdam and Rotterdam as well as over 80 railway stations in the Netherlands are only accessible by passing through a ticket barrier. These barriers are designed to make access to the platforms (and therefore any vehicle) harder without checking in beforehand. When checking in at a ticket barrier, the gates are opened after a deposit has been collected from the stored value on the passenger's OV-chipkaart or when an appropriate travel product has been acknowledged. If no travel product (such as a single or return journey) has been loaded or no deposit can be collected because of insufficient funds on the card, the ticket barriers will refuse to open and access to the station is denied. Since traditional paper tickets will continue to be used for some rail journeys, such as for international travel or in case of e-tickets, at least one ticket barrier will be equipped with both an OV-chipkaart reader and a barcode reader. The latter can be used to open the gate by scanning the square barcode on paper tickets. Passengers who wish to upgrade to first class on OV-chipkaarts normally configured for second class journeys need to go to a ticket desk or vending machine to ensure the correct fare will be deducted.

Smaller railway and metro stations are often not equipped with ticket barriers. Instead, free-standing validators (card readers) are used for checking in and out. While ticket barriers are either programmed for checking in or for checking out, depending on whether the turnstile is used for entering or leaving a station, free-standing units can be used for both checking in and out.

During a rail or metro journey, conductors or ticket inspectors use mobile card readers to verify whether passengers have properly checked in with their OV-chipkaart before boarding.

=== Use on buses, trams and light rail ===
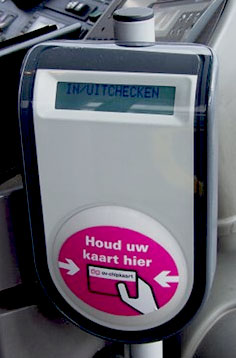
OV-chipkaart reader in a bus.

All buses, trams and RandstadRail (light rail) vehicles have card readers on board, located near the doors within the vehicle itself (except on trams in Utrecht, where card readers are placed at the tram stops). On most buses and trams in the Netherlands, passengers are required to board at a door near the driver or conductor, which allows the check-in process to be monitored. As checking out and leaving the vehicle is more difficult to monitor, passengers travelling on credit can evade part of their fare by checking out before the vehicle has arrived at the stop or station where they intend to alight. It is for this reason that ticket inspections continue to take place randomly.

Forgetting to check out when disembarking a vehicle cause a passenger to lose their check-in deposit. The screens on card validators and ticket barriers display the amount deducted from the stored credit and remaining balance when a passenger checks out.

Examples of travel products available per type of card
Travel product	Mode of transport	Area or network (operator)	Disposable chipkaart	Anonymous OV-chipkaart	Personal OV-chipkaart
Travel on pre-loaded credit (e-purse)	All	All	No	Yes	Yes
Single or return journey	Rail	National (NS) and regional (Arriva, Keolis Nederland and others)	Yes	No	No
Weekend unlimited travel year pass	Rail	National (NS) and regional (Arriva, Keolis Nederland and others)	No	No	Yes
Off-peak discount plan	Rail	National (NS) and regional (Arriva, Keolis Nederland and others)	No	No	Yes
One-hour unlimited travel	Metro, tram, lightrail, bus	Amsterdam (GVB), Rotterdam (RET), The Hague (HTM)	Yes	Yes	Yes
Three-day unlimited travel	Metro, tram, lightrail, bus	Amsterdam (GVB), Rotterdam (RET), The Hague (HTM)	Yes	Yes	Yes
Student unlimited travel weekdays	All	All	No	No	Yes

== Technology ==
The first OV-chipkaarts were based on MIFARE technology, developed by NXP Semiconductors. The anonymous and personal versions of the card used MIFARE Classic 4K chips, protected from unlawful access by security keys known only to the vendor. The disposable, single-use cards used the cheaper MIFARE Ultralight chips that do not employ any encryption, and can be read by anyone.

The MIFARE Crypto-1 encryption algorithm was believed to have been cracked in 2007. Further hacking reports in 2010 and 2011 and several technological reviews made it clear that the original chip technology was not sufficiently secure. From 2011 to 2012, card operator TLS issued cards based on the more fraud-resistant Infineon SLE 66 microcontroller. In 2012, TLS upgraded to the Infineon SLE 77 technology.

== Types of cards ==
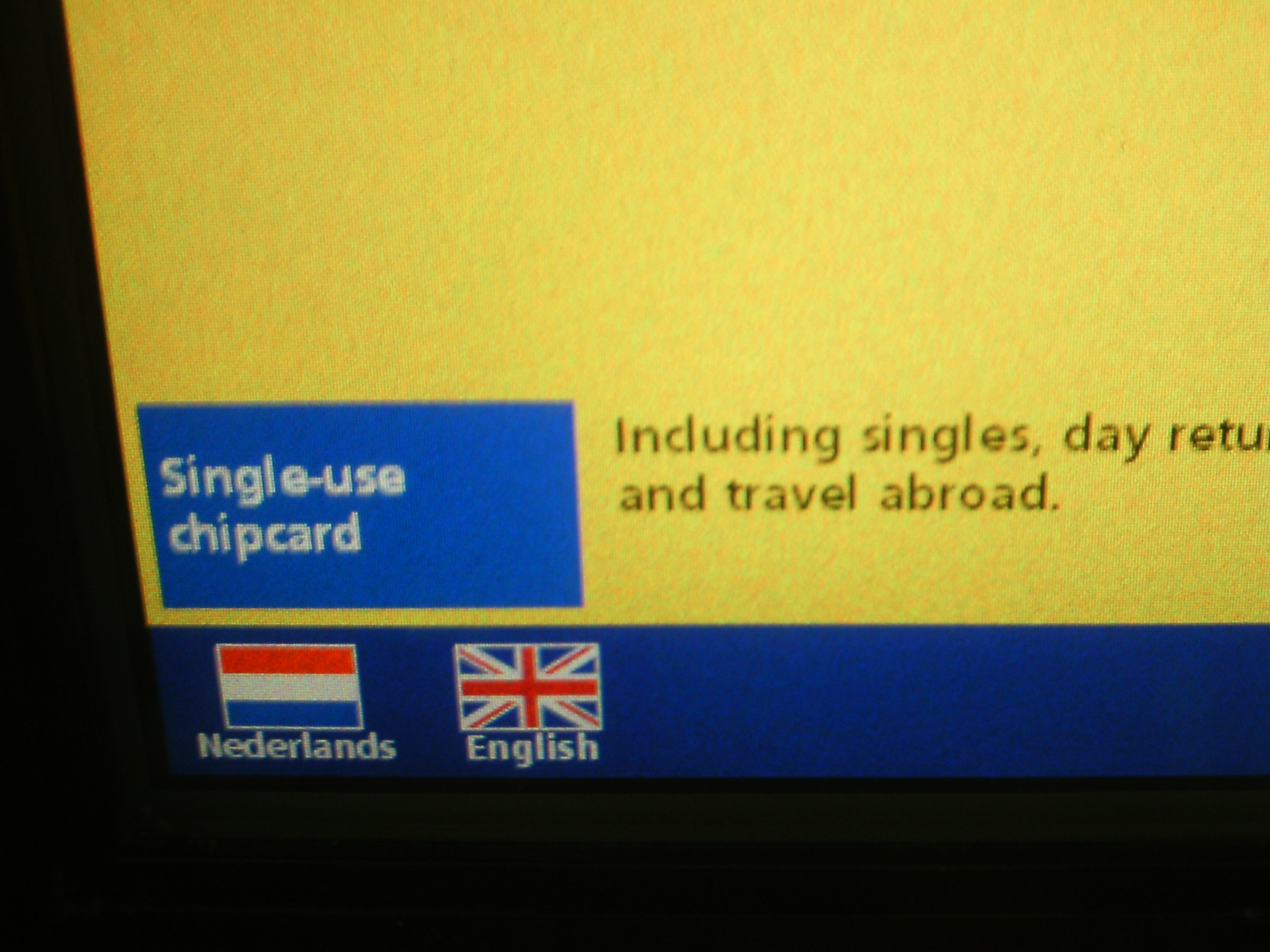
Ticket machine at railway station offering the possibility to obtain a disposable OV-chipkaart, comparable to the traditional paper singles and returns.

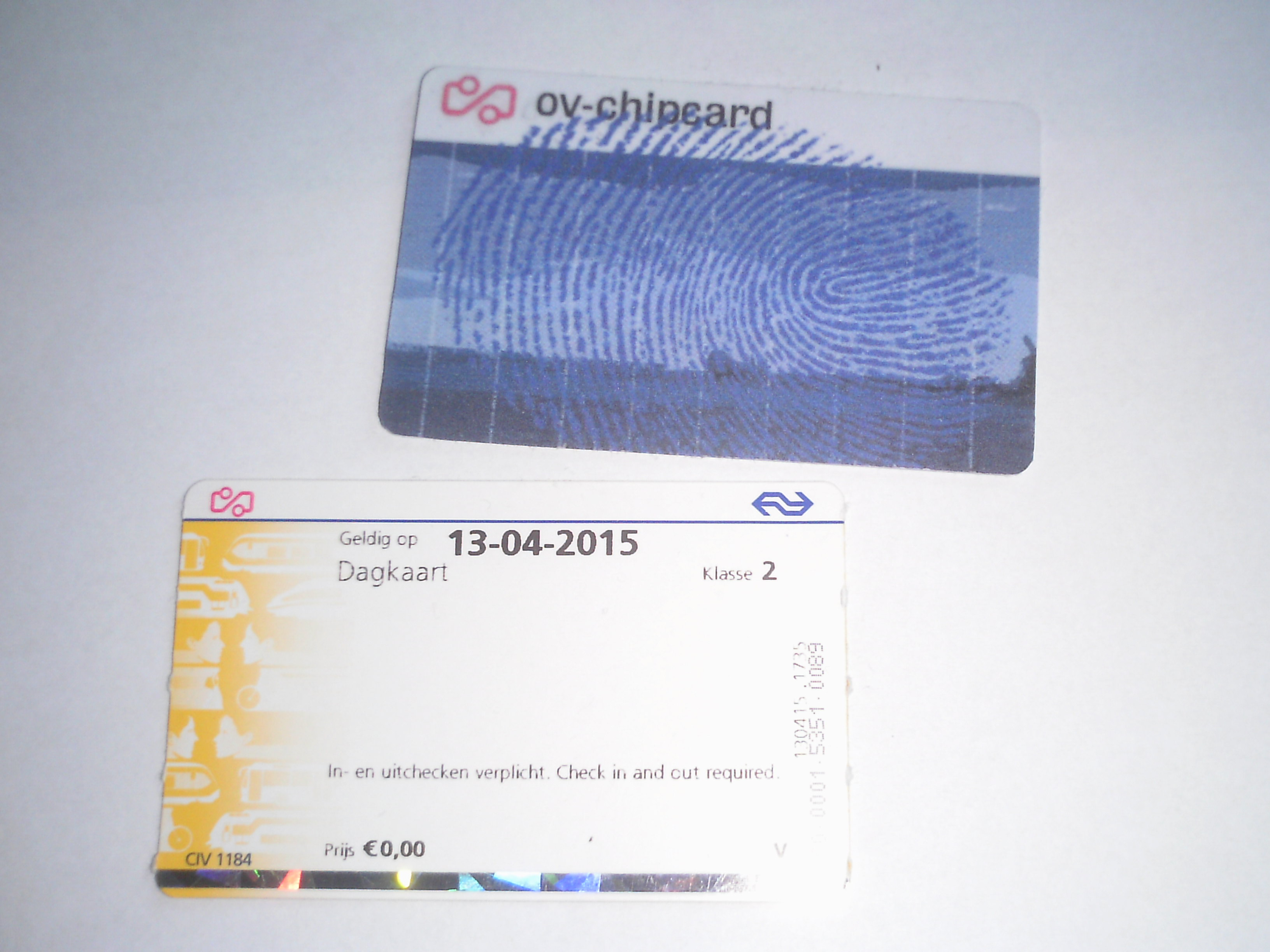
A disposable (below) and a re-usable card (top)

The OV-chipkaart is available in three versions: the disposable OV-chipkaart, the anonymous OV-chipkaart, and the personal OV-chipkaart. Disposable cards are for one-time or short-period use (and incur a surcharge compared with normal journey price), the latter two types valid for five years and can be used as a stored-value card, also known as electronic purse or e-purse.

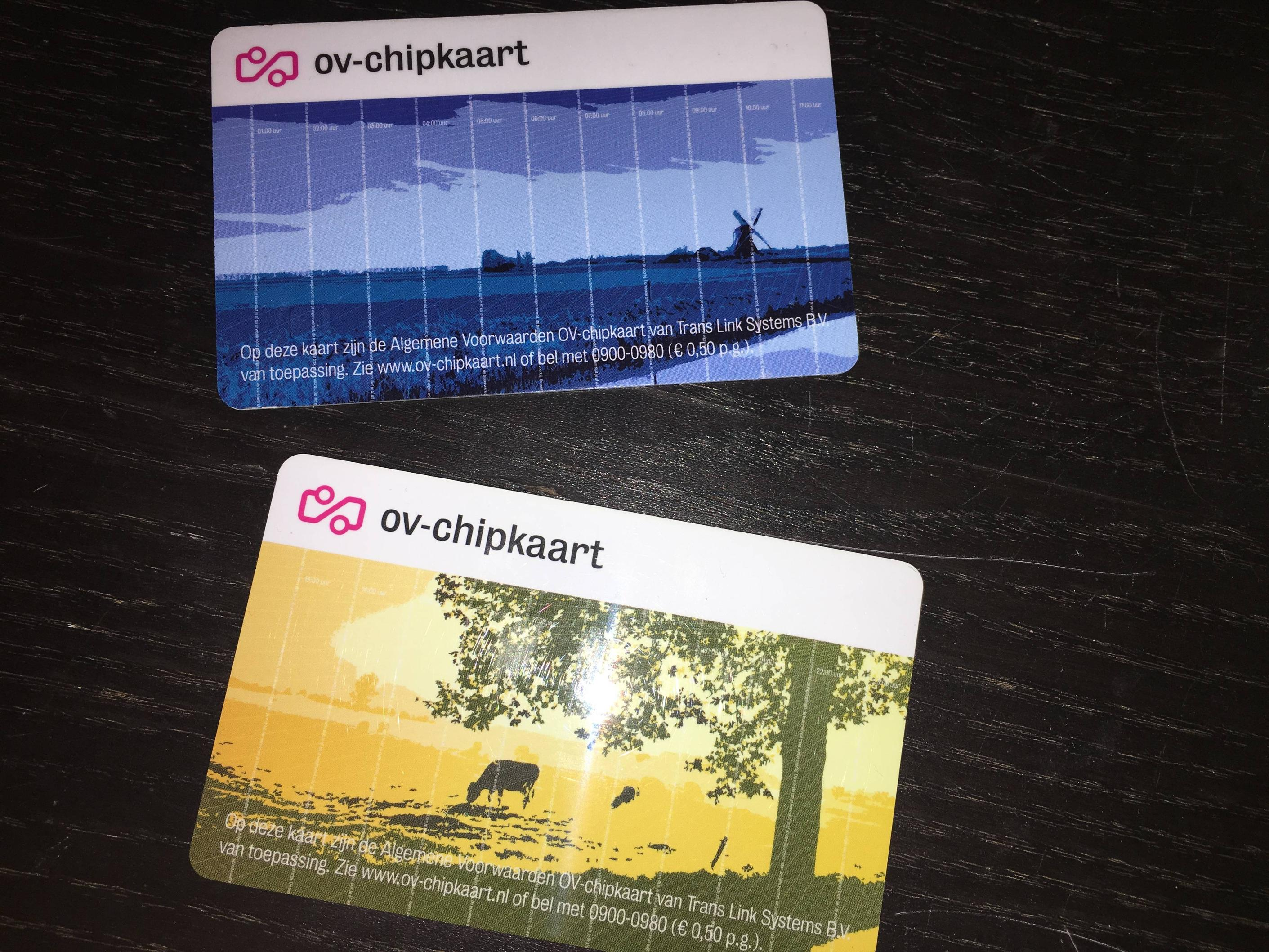
An anonymous OV-chipkaart (blue) and a personal OV-chipkaart (yellow)

=== Disposable OV-chipkaart ===
The disposable version of the OV-chipkaart (Dutch: eenmalige chipkaart or wegwerpkaart) is made of thick paper, suitable for short use. It can only be used for simple travel products (such as single or return journeys on trains or unlimited travel on a city or regional network for a certain period of time). Since it cannot be topped up with credit, it is not usable as a stored-value card. Disposable tickets are intended for passengers who use public transport infrequently. Journey fares are normally higher when travelling on a disposable card rather than on a reusable (anonymous or personal) OV-chipkaart.

Disposable train or metro tickets must be purchased before boarding at a ticket machine or service counter and validated by checking in at a ticket barrier or validator unit (card reader). For train journeys, the traditional paper singles and returns have been replaced by disposable OV-chipkaart tickets as of July 2014. Because of a surcharge of €1 for rail journeys on a disposable card, frequent travellers are encouraged to travel on pre-loaded credit with a reusable anonymous or personal OV-chipkaart. Since July 2014, international rail tickets are also issued in the form of disposable cards when purchased at a Dutch railway station, but without a surcharge. Traditional paper tickets for international travel purchased online or abroad will remain valid.

For bus and tram journeys, disposable tickets are available at ticket machines or on board and must also be validated by checking in and out.

=== Anonymous OV-chipkaart ===
The anonymous OV-chipkaart (Dutch: anonieme OV-chipkaart) is a reusable, credit-card-sized card for passengers who travel more frequently. It is sold at public transport ticket machines and service counters for a one-time fee, normally €7.50. Unlike the disposable version, it can be used as a stored-value card: users travel on pre-loaded credit and pay per kilometer. The credit balance (saldo) of the card is "topped up" at vending machines at stations or shops. It can be used on all modes of transport and with all transport operators immediately after loading credit. For travel on pre-loaded credit on NS trains, however, cards purchased at vending machines of other transport operators must first be activated once at an NS ticket machine by adding credit to the balance.

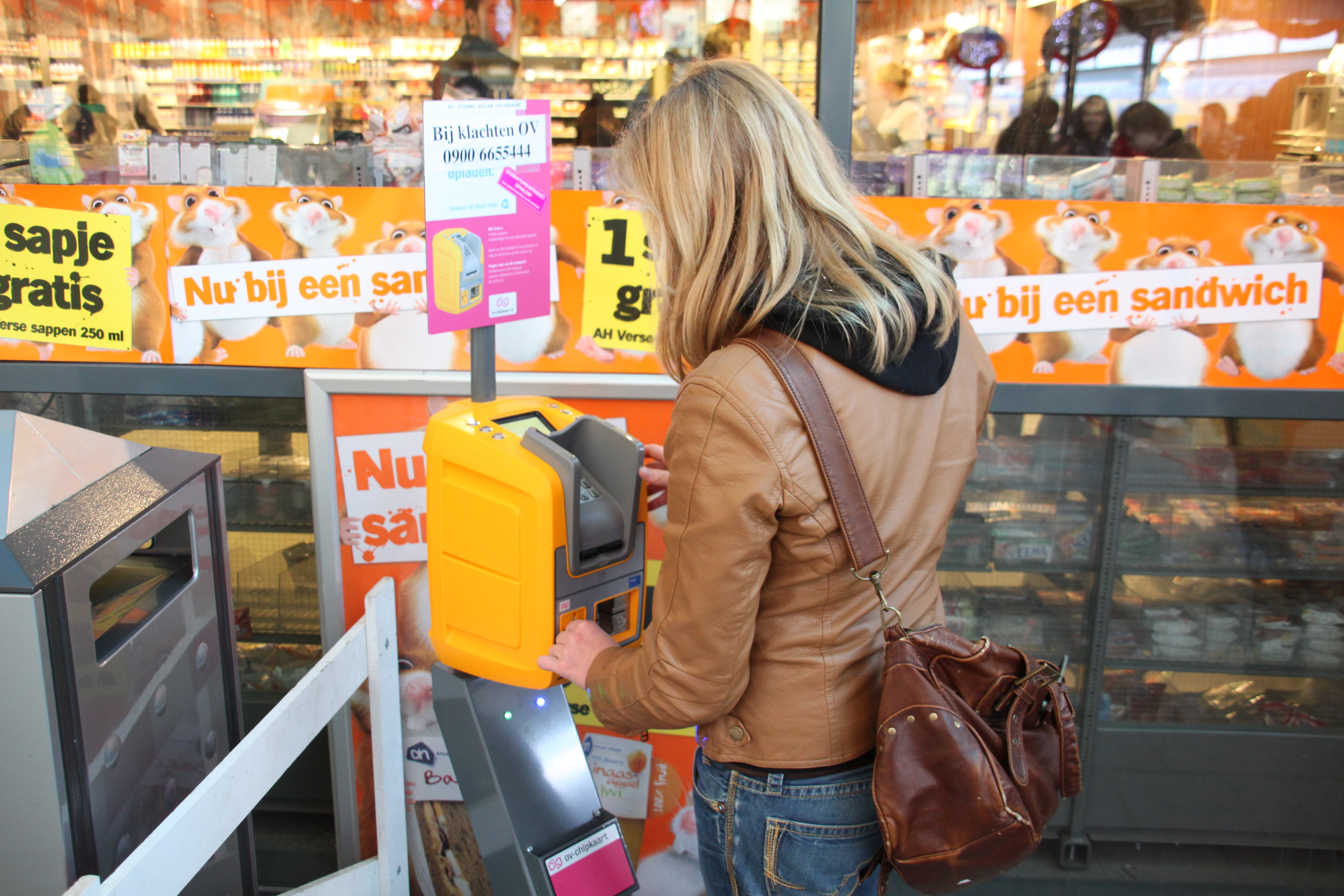
Yellow recharge machines, found at supermarkets or tobacco shops, to be used to top up OV-chipkaart credit.

An anonymous OV-chipkaart must have a minimum credit balance of €4 for travel on most buses and all trams and metros and €20 for trains operated by NS in order to be able to "check in" at a ticket barrier or card reader at the beginning of the journey (which the system takes as a deposit during the journey). The appropriate journey price is calculated when checking out at the end of each journey. The card is transferable between persons, although only one person can use an anonymous OV-chipkaart at any one time.

Anonymous cards can also be used to store a limited number of non-personalized travel products, such as one-hour or day passes for specific public transport systems. For example, the Amsterdam public transport operator GVB offers day passes valid for up to seven days which can be loaded on an anonymous card or purchased on a disposable card, but season tickets can be loaded only on a personal OV-chipkaart.

=== Personal OV-chipkaart ===
The personal OV-chipkaart (Dutch: persoonlijke OV-chipkaart) is similar to the anonymous version of the OV-chipkaart in the sense that it can be used as a stored-value card to travel on pre-loaded credit. In addition, it can be used to load seasonal passes, discount plans and other travel products of a period longer than a single month or travel products which are only available to specific groups, such as older persons or students. A personal card is non-transferable and is issued with a photograph and date of birth of the user. The card can be cancelled with the credit being blocked in case it is lost or stolen, and it can be set to automatically top up (Dutch: automatisch opladen) when the electronic purse credit drops below a certain level.

Personal OV-chipkaarts are issued by card operator TLS for a one-time fee, normally €7.50. It can be applied for online at the OV-chipkaart website or by paper application form provided by a public transport operator. Some transport operators provide personal cards for free when purchasing seasonal passes or discount plans, with the pass or plan already loaded on the card. The personal OV-chipkaart is intended for use by residents of the Netherlands, as a Dutch permanent address and bank account must be provided when applying for a card. Residents of Belgium, Germany and Luxembourg can apply for a personal OV-chipkaart by using a Dutch bank account or PayPal. If payment is processed with PayPal, however, it will not be possible to use the automatic top-up feature.

== Issues and criticisms ==
The implementation of the OV-chipkaart system in all public transport systems in the Netherlands has proven to be a complex and time-consuming project. The process, which started in 2005 and was finally completed in 2014, has been plagued with cost-overruns, delays because of technical difficulties, planning and co-ordination problems, and resistance from consumer groups and politicians because of concerns over the safety and user-friendliness of the system, resulting in waning public support. Nevertheless, as passengers are becoming accustomed to the smart card system, recent surveys published by card operator TLS indicate that user satisfaction is increasing.

=== Passengers not checking out ===
Passengers travelling on pre-loaded credit must always check out at the end of their journey in order for the deposit, which was deducted upon check-in, to be reimbursed to their OV-chipkaart. While checking out is unavoidable at railway or metro stations closed off with ticket barriers, stations with free-standing validator units as well as trams and buses can be exited without checking out. An estimated 2% of occasional passengers and 0.5% of frequent travellers forget to check out. Even though passengers can reclaim their deposit, many are not aware of their failure to check out. In addition, the reimbursement procedure requires submitting a paper or online form with the transport operator concerned which some passenger consider too cumbersome in relation to the amount lost. An investigation commissioned by passenger associations showed that the check-out problem results in an estimated profit of nearly €23 million a year for public transport operators. About half of this amount would go to NS as the principal rail operator. Transport operators have questioned the validity of the numbers, claiming the total amount is not more than a few million euros and that they are willing to reimburse lost deposits. However, an NS spokesperson responded, "the travellers who have forgotten to check out have to announce themselves".

The counter-argument is that passengers, particularly by train, can check in, travel a distance that would be more expensive than the deposit amount, and then not check out, allowing the passenger to save more than if they had checked out at the station of destination. Furthermore, a passenger is able to check in at the departure station, cross the country, not check out and then dishonestly reclaim the money from NS as if she had travelled only one stop.

The check-out problem was one of the reasons the Rotterdam public transport operator RET began an experiment in March 2014 with travelling-on-account, whereby OV-chipkaart users do not need to pre-load credit or maintain a minimum balance for the deposit to be deducted, but instead receive a bill for their journeys at the end of the month.

=== Privacy concerns ===
Privacy has been a major subject of debate from the start of the OV-chipkaart implementation process. The OV-chipkaart system allows for collecting travel data and connecting those to personal data of passengers, thereby creating an opportunity for public transport operators and card operator TLS to track passengers or build an image of an individual's travel behaviour. Travel data are collected and stored by both TLS and the public transport operator concerned. Under the OV-chipkaart privacy policy, data are stored for a maximum of 18 months in accordance with the Dutch Data Protection Act.

After an investigation by the Dutch Data Protection Authority in 2007 of the effect of the system in the Amsterdam metro, it concluded that the Amsterdam public transport operator GVB violated Dutch privacy legislation by storing personal and travel data together. In response, GVB and other operators decided to store these sets of data separately. By doing so, the Data Protection Authority concluded, "the risk of the unlawful monitoring of individual people’s travel behaviour will be limited considerably."

In a lawsuit brought by a group of students against main rail operator NS in 2012, the district court in Utrecht ruled that NS did not act unlawfully by requiring students to check in and check out when travelling on their government-sponsored public transport pass, which could only by used when loaded on a personal OV-chipkaart. The court concluded that the rail operator had a legitimate reason for mandating the check-in process, because it was a reasonable way of ensuring that passengers have a valid title for their journey.

In 2012, the Dutch Data Protection Authority found that rail operator NS violated privacy legislation by using personal data for marketing purposes. Passengers wanting to use their anonymous OV-chipkaart to travel on NS trains were required to activate their card via the NS website. During the activation process, an e-mail address had to be provided which was subsequently used for marketing purposes. The Data Protection Authority stated that passengers travelling on an anonymous card may reasonably expect their anonymity to be respected. In response, NS decided to adjust the activation process in accordance with the ruling. Entering an e-mail address is now no longer required when activating an anonymous card for NS travel.

=== Security ===
Independent technological reviews and several hacking attempts continue to draw attention to the security and safety of the OV-chipkaart system. In 2007, students at the University of Amsterdam discovered several vulnerabilities in the disposable, single-use chipcard technology used by municipal transport operator GVB, which allowed for the cards to be reprogrammed for unlimited use. Card operator TLS was able to fix the software bug which allowed for such interference. German hackers reported later that year that the security code of the MIFARE Classic chips used for anonymous and personal OV-chipkaarts could easily be hacked with technology available for less than 100 euros. A security analysis by the Netherlands Organisation for Applied Scientific Research (TNO), commissioned early 2008 by TLS in response to the hacking claims, concluded that the MIFARE Classic chipcard should indeed be replaced because of serious security shortcomings, but that urgent migration to a more secure and better encrypted chip technology was not necessary because of the low value of OV-chipkaarts for criminal exploitation. A counter expertise review by the Information Security Group at Royal Holloway, University of London, commissioned by the Dutch Ministry of Transport, Public Works and Water Management, concluded that the TNO report underestimated (later acknowledged by TNO itself) the risk of more systematic hacking attempts in the future and the ease with which these could be carried out, as well as the loss of confidence in the system this may cause with passengers. The review recommended a replacement of all existing chip cards in circulation to be completed at the time the OV-chipkaart system was to be implemented nationally in 2009 and, in the long term, that phased migration of different card types to newer chip technology was important to keep the system future-proof.

When the Royal Holloway review was presented to the Dutch House of Representatives in April 2008, co-ordinating state secretary Huizinga expressed doubt as to whether the planning for the national roll-out of the OV-chipkaart and subsequent phasing out of the traditional paper ticketing systems, which was set to be completed by January 1, 2009, was still realistic. The government majority in the House nevertheless voted to continue with the roll-out process after a parliamentary committee visit to London where lawmakers had discussions with Transport for London officials and representatives of consumer organisation London TravelWatch about the technical features of the Oyster Card, which operates on the same chip technology. Nevertheless, it took until October 2011 until the phase-out of the traditional paper tickets for buses, metros, and trams was completed in all regions. Despite new publications that year of successful hacking attempts as well as fraud schemes, transport minister Schultz concluded that the card was safe enough to fully replace the thirty-year-old strippenkaart system.

Later in 2011, it appeared that TLS had started issuing a new version of the OV-chipkaart, which no longer uses the Dutch MIFARE chip but a chip manufactured by the German semiconductor company Infineon. In 2013, TLS reported that because of this new chip, fraud had been reduced to a minimum.

== Awards ==
In April 2007, the OV-chipkaart received a Computerworld Honors Program Laureate award.

== See also ==
- List of smart cards
- Oyster card - a similar scheme in London, United Kingdom
- OVpay - using contactless payments on all public transport in The Netherlands
