= Agho Obaseki =

Iyase of Benin (1914–1920)

Chief Agho Obaseki (died September 9, 1920) was a paramount chief in the Benin Kingdom and its successor territories from 1898 to 1914, and then Iyase of Benin from 1914 until his death in 1920.

== Background ==
Chief Agho Ogbedeoyo Obaseki of Benin acted as the Prime Minister (Iyase) of Benin during the interregnum (1897-1914) as Head of Administration when Oba Ovonramwen was exiled. Agho was the last of his father Ogbeide's children. Ogbeide held the Bini Ine title under Oba Adolo. His family were descendants of Oba Ehengbuda, the Oba of Benin from 1578 to 1604. They had migrated from Benin to Nsukwa. The first Obi of Nsukwa was a son of Oba Ehengbuda.

Agho Obaseki's great-great-grandfather, Prince Emokhua N’Obo, was a native doctor and had a power tussle with his brother over the accession to the throne of their father, the Obi of Nsukwa and son of Oba Ehengbuda.

The Ine was the head of the palace society of Ibiwe and was responsible for raising the heir apparent and the other princes. When he was about 25 years old, he got into some trouble in the village of Iguovinyoba when he was entangled with a married woman. He thereafter left for Benin City to start a new life and there he met Crown Prince Idugbowa, later Oba Ovonramwen Nogbaisi, who took Agho under protection and a friendship between the two men ensued. A young Agho then became a trader for Prince Idugbowa.

== Ovonramwen's ascendancy, Agho's trading growth, and award of the Obaseki title ==
When Prince Idgubowa became Oba Ovonramwen, Agho enjoyed a monopoly in trading palm oil and kernels for European products such as rum, matches, salt, clothing, silks, and other imports. Consequently, Agho brought great wealth to Oba Ovonramwen and himself and was rewarded as the head servant of the Benin royal house charged with settling minor household disputes. Oba Ovonramwen also rewarded Agho with his first wife, Etuohun, and granted him the Obaseki title which was then incorporated into the Iweguae titleholding society. Obaseki means "the Oba's favour is more valuable than mere success in trade"; this title was received in 1889. Oba Ovonramwen further enhanced Obaseki's status by gifting him one hundred slaves who had been war captives.

== Fall of Benin and change in relationship with Ovonramwen ==
Obaseki played a crucial role in the events leading to the Fall of Benin from the Punitive Expedition of 1897. He had organized a defence of Benin and accompanied Oba Ovonramwen during his escape from British rocket fire. Ovonramwen instructed Obaseki in April 1897 to survey Benin in the aftermath of the British bombardment. Obaseki was discovered by the British and was prevented from returning to Ovonramwen because the British saw him as useful for the new political order they were to impose. Alfred Turner, the British Resident, appointed Obaseki to the Council of Chiefs in September 1897.

== Paramount Chief of Benin ==
Oba Ovonramwen stood trial in August for actions leading up to the Punitive Expedition, was found guilty by the British, deposed, and exiled to Calabar leading to a leadership vacuum that the British filled by making Obaseki the de facto head of the newly constituted Benin Native Council because of Obaseki's administrative skills and political acumen.

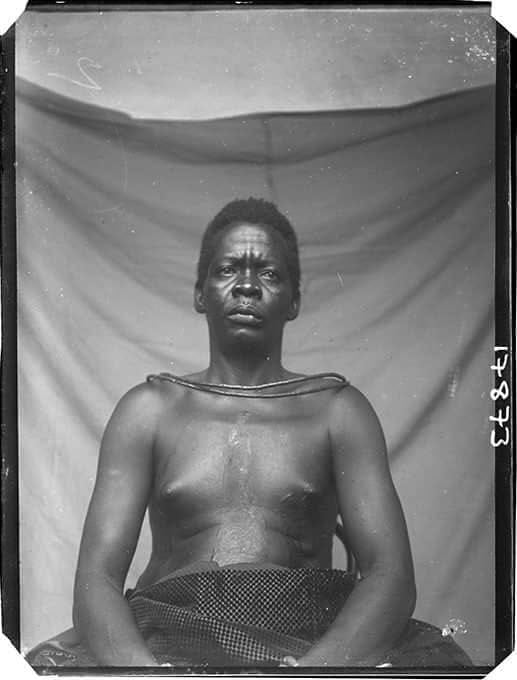
Chief Agho Obaseki was a paramount chief in the Benin Kingdom

== Iyase of Benin ==
Ovonramwen died on January 13, 1914, paving the way for Prince Aiguobasimwin (Oba Eweka II) to become Oba. The British authorities, however, broke with tradition by appointing Obaseki as the Iyase of Benin (Chief Adviser to the Oba), much to the dismay of the newly installed Oba Eweka II. Consequently, a power struggle ensued between Oba Eweka II and Obaseki, the new Iyase of Benin. The Iyase overshadowed the Oba under the new British political dispensation and even according to the British who backed him, was 'certainly most dictatorial and arrogant in his behaviour'.

=== New Yam Festival palaver ===
Obaseki embraced Christianity in 1917 and consequently stopped participating in palace rituals such as the opening of the New Yam Festival. Since yams could not be harvested without the Iyase participating, hard times followed and the British had to intervene. The Oba retorted that the festivities could not commence without the Iyase's participation and the Iyase, in turn, countered that his new religion compelled his non-participation. Oba Eweka II was thus forced to open the festivities without the Iyase, humiliated by publicly apologizing to Obaseki, and in an act of reconciliation, the Oba gave his daughter to Obaseki in marriage. Obaseki now had as wives the daughters of two successive Obas (first Ovonramwen, who married off Orinmwiame while in exile, and now Eweka II).

== Death and legacy ==
Obaseki suffered from pneumonia and died on September 9, 1920. His sons are Chief Aiyamekhue Jackson Obaseki (Esama of Benin Kingdom), a title that is traditionally held by the richest man in Benin, Chief Downson Obaseki (The Obaruyiedo Of Benin Kinddom), London Igbinovia Obaseki, Wilson Aigbedo, Agboifo, Humphrey, and Gaius Ikuobasoyenmwen, who later became an Action Group chieftain. Accounts of his life and political career are contained in two books; Obaseki of Benin (African Historical Biographies Series) and The Nemesis of Power: Agho Obaseki and Benin Politics 1897-1956, the latter having been authored by Nigerian historian Philip Igbafe.'
