= European Business School =

European Business School is the name of several educational institutions:

- EBS University of Business and Law in Oestrich-Winkel and Wiesbaden (Germany), up to 2011 operating under the name European Business School International University Schloss Reichartshausen
- European Business School Dublin (Ireland)
- European Business School London (Great Britain)
- European Business School Madrid (Spain)
- European Business School Paris (France)
- EU Business School operating as EU Business School in Barcelona (Spain), Munich (Germany), Geneva and Montreux (Switzerland)
- For the "European Business School Cambridge", see Isles International University.
