= Europe by Satellite =

European television information service

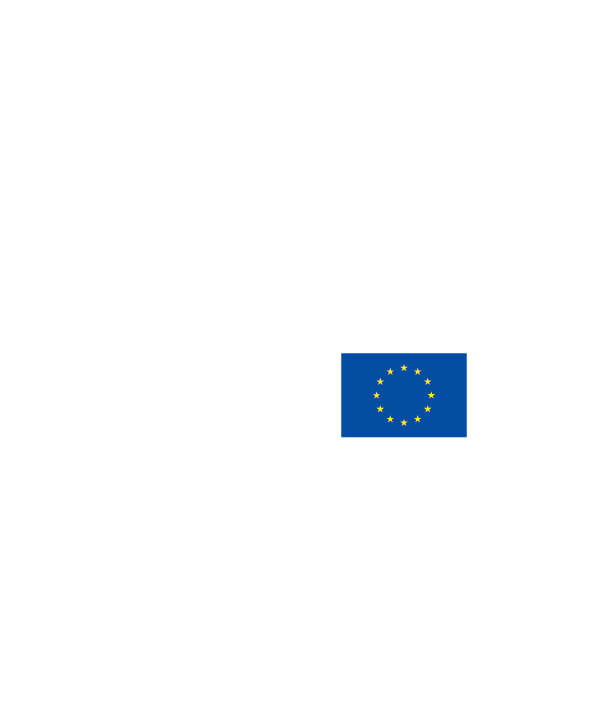

The European Broadcasting Service (EBS) (formerly Europe by Satellite) is the TV information service of the European Union which includes 2 TV channels: EBS and EBS+. Managed by the European Commission, it broadcasts images coming from all EU Institutions like the European Parliament, the European Council, the European Central Bank, the European Committee of the Regions, and the European Court of Justice.

The EBS was launched in 1995 with the purpose of providing TV, radio stations and other news services with live pictures and sounds coming from the EU, in all official EU languages. The programming consists of a mix of live events, stock shots, edited programmes and video clips on EU subjects produced by various EU Institutions and Directorates. EbS delivers a unique archive on the history of the EU. All the material from EBS and its archive may be used free of charge for EU-related information and educational purposes.

== Satellite footprint ==
EBS service is available via unencrypted satellite signals and the services are on Eutelsat 9B. The satellite footprint covers all Europe, North Africa, the Middle East, and Asia. More details here

== Audiovisual Portal ==
EBS service is also available online, on the Audiovisual Portal managed by the European Commission where the schedule of both channels is available for streaming and download purposes. Download functionalities offer several file formats: MP3 for audio files, MP4 h264 broadcast quality and MPEG4 web quality for the video files. In addition, the video embed code is also available for the user.

- EBS Live transmission / Schedule
- EBS+ Live transmission / Schedule

== Services ==
- Inter-institutional content, coming from the European Commission, the European Parliament, the Council of the European Union, the European Central Bank and other institutions of the EU;
- Live coverage of events, press conferences, briefings, EP plenary sessions, ceremonies;
- Stock shots and programmes produced by EC services and other EU institutions;
- The material on EbS may freely be used by media professionals. The restrictions are given here.
- Online streaming of EbS on the internet, low resolution, live and on demand (up to 7 days), and in 25 languages – a unique service on the World Wide Web;
- Online broadcast quality TV and radio files, available for download on the internet, allowing the EU to reach broadcasters anywhere in the world;
