= National tariff system (Netherlands) =

Public-transport ticketing and zoning scheme

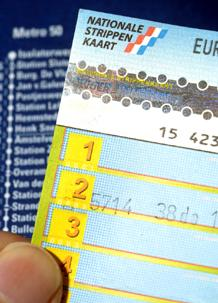
Strippenkaart

The national tariff system (Dutch: nationaal tariefsysteem or nationale vervoerbewijzen/NVB) is a ticketing and zoning scheme for local public transport in the Netherlands. It was designed as a nationwide scheme but is being phased out (see section on validity, below) and replaced by the OV-chipkaart. With the abolition of the strippenkaart (strip card) on 3 November 2011, only the sterabonnement (Star subscription) remains organized under the national tariff system. The system does not apply to Dutch Railways (NS), which have their own pricing regime; however, there are limited sections of railway (generally in urban areas or on non-NS lines) on which the system is valid.

== Validity ==
The national tariff system applies on most local bus and tram routes, with the exception of special tourist and leisure services, express services, night buses; and buurtbussen, which are neighbourhood services run by volunteers. In addition, it no longer applies in the Amsterdam and Rotterdam regions.

=== Validity on the railways ===
The system also applies to the following rail routes:

- Groningen – Roodeschool (Arriva)
- Groningen – Delfzijl (Arriva)
- Groningen – Nieuweschans – Leer (Germany) (Arriva)
- Arnhem – Winterswijk (Keolis Nederland)
- Zutphen – Winterswijk (Keolis Nederland)
- Zutphen – Oldenzaal (Keolis Nederland)
- Zutphen – Apeldoorn (NS)
- Between all stations in The Hague, Rijswijk and Voorburg
- Maastricht Randwyck – Maastricht – Heerlen (Arriva)
- Sittard – Kerkrade (Arriva)
- Between all stations in Rotterdam, Capelle a/d IJssel, Schiedam and Vlaardingen
- Utrecht Overvecht – Utrecht Centraal – Utrecht Lunetten

== Tickets ==
=== Strippenkaart ===
The strippenkaart, introduced on 1 October 1980 and abolished on 3 November 2011, was a ticket composed of several strips, to be validated when used. Passengers either validated the ticket themselves in a machine, or got it stamped by the driver or conductor. The number of strips to be cancelled was always the number of zones travelled plus one, up to a maximum of 20 strips. The stamped ticket was valid for an hour for two to four strips, up to three-and-a-half hours for 17 to 20 strips.

Strippenkaart tickets were available in denominations of two, three, eight, 15 and 45 strips. Reduced tariff tickets were only available in 15-strip versions. An eight-strip ticket could be used as a one-day ticket in The Hague and Utrecht if especially validated (at the same cost).

Strippenkaart prices (As of 1 January 2011)

2-strippenkaart	€1.60
3-strippenkaart	€2.40
8-strippenkaart	€6.40
15-strippenkaart	€7.70
15-strippenkaart (reduced rate)	€5.00
45-strippenkaart	€22.80

Local day-ticket Den Haag or Utrecht (one 8-strippenkaart)	€6,40
Local day-ticket Den Haag or Utrecht, reduced rate (four strips of a 8-strippenkaart)	€3,20
Nationwide day-ticket full fare (two 8-strippenkaarten)	€12,80
Nationwide day-ticket reduce fare (one 8-strippenkaart)	€6,40

Strippenkaarten were sold by tobacconists, supermarkets, tourist offices and public transport companies. Only the smaller denomination tickets (up to 8 strips) were available on board, hence the small difference in price between 8 and 15 strip tickets, to encourage pre-purchasing which speeds up boarding times.

The strippenkaart ceased to be valid on 3 November 2011.

=== Sterabonnement ===
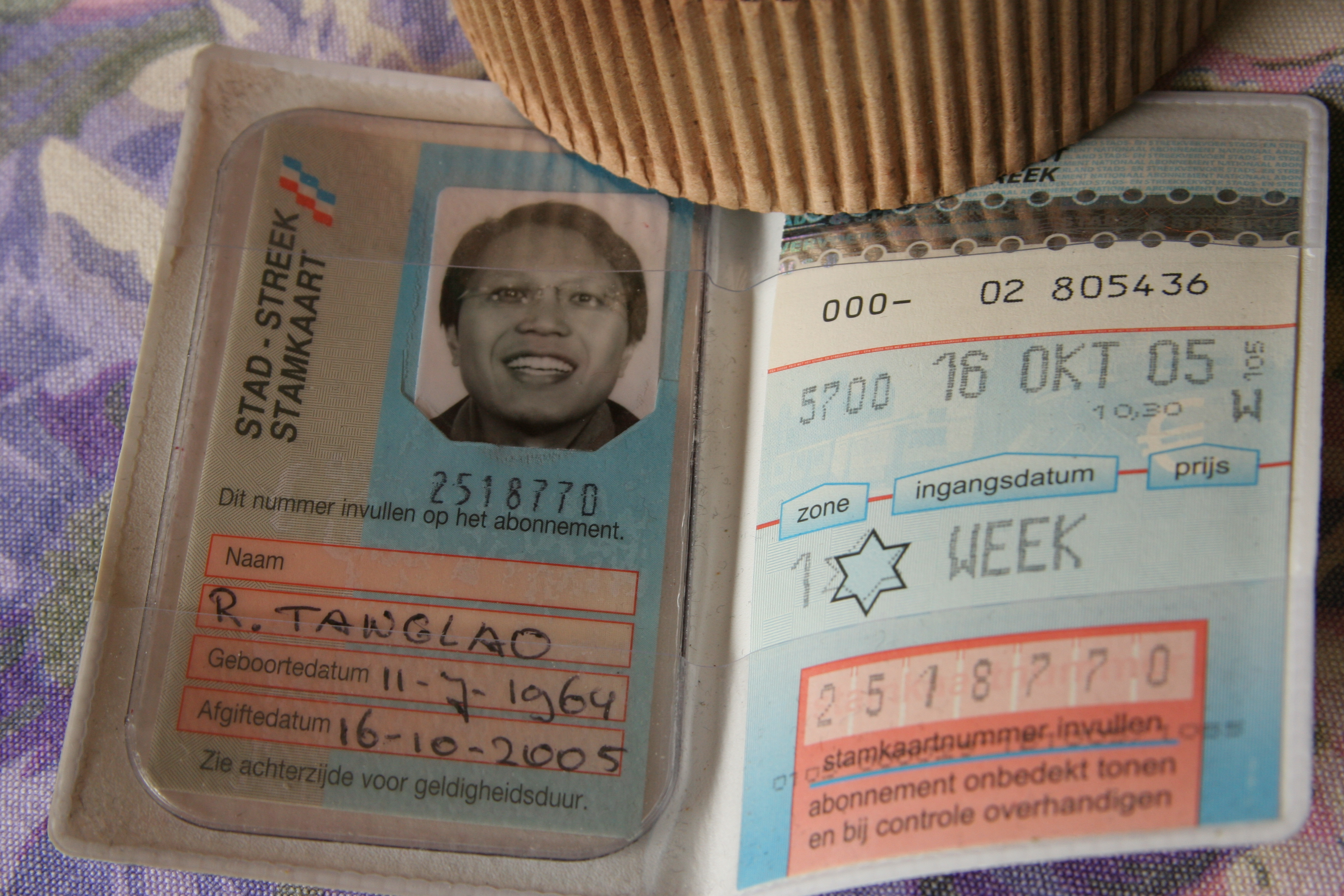
A weekly subscription.

The Sterabonnement (Star subscription) is the season ticket of Dutch local public transport. It is similar to the Strippenkaart in that it is zone dependent, although validity is set at the time of purchase to the number of zones chosen. The Sterabonnement is slightly different from the Strippenkaart as each ticket's validity is dependent on its "star" value (Ster is the Dutch word for star). The table below summarises the Sterabonnement's validity.

Star value	Validity
1-ster	1 selected zone
2-ster	The selected zone + 1 adjacent zone in each direction
3-ster	The selected zone + 2 adjacent zones in each direction
4-ster	The selected zone + 3 adjacent zones in each direction
5-ster	The selected zone + 4 adjacent zones in each direction
6-ster	The selected zone + 5 adjacent zones in each direction
N	All zones in the Netherlands

=== Zomerzwerfkaart ===
The Zomerzwerfkaart or "Summer roaming card" is a special ticket available only during June, July and August, which allows the bearer to travel for a whole day in the Netherlands on public transport subject to the National Tariff System. This ticket, however, is not sold by Connexxion, but is nevertheless valid on the company's services.

== See also ==
- nl.Wikipedia page about the Strippenkaart (in Dutch)
- nl.Wikipedia page about the OV-Chipkaart (in Dutch)
