= Gaius Obaseki =

Nigerian politician

Chief Gaius Obaseki CBE

Vice President of the Action Group
- Incumbent
- Assumed office 1951

Iyase of Benin
- Incumbent
- Assumed office 1948

Personal details
- Born: Benin City, Nigeria
- Died: 1956
- Occupation: Politician, civil servant, businessman
- Known for: Benin politics

Chief Gaius Obaseki CBE was a Nigerian politician who was Vice President of the Action Group in 1951. He was a leader of a group of educated Benin residents and contractors who sought representation and a voice in Benin’s governance. He was conferred with the title Iyase of Benin with the support of educated youths, the taxpayers community and the colonial government who were his previous employers. However, many educated youths who supported his rise in politics became disappointed as a result of the activities of the Reformed Ogboni in Benin which had Obaseki as its master (Oluwo).

Obaseki was a nominated member of the Nigerian Legislative Council and the governor's Executive Council. He served in these capacities while he held the title of Iyase.

== Life ==
Obaseki was born to the family of Agho Obaseki, a Benin chief. He attended Benin City Government Elementary School and the School of Survey, Lagos. Thereafter, he worked for the colonial government as an interpreter before retiring as Chief Clerk in the office of the residents. After retirement, he established a timber business.

Obaseki was appointed Iyase of Benin in 1948 having earned the support of the Benin Community Taxpayers Association largely led by his fellow contractors and the educated youths within the division. The goodwill from these sections of the Benin community influenced his conferment as he was not the first choice of Oba Akenzua II. Both families had a history, Akenzua's father, Oba Eweka and Obaseki's father, Agho, the Iyase were antagonists.

After reforms in the local governance structure, the taxpayers group gained control of a newly created Benin Divisional Council. Obaseki became chairman of the new Council and also chairman of the Administrative Staff Committee that coordinated the activities of the Benin Central Council, the Native Authority led by the Oba and the Divisional Council. He was later nominated as a member of the Legislative Council and the governor's Executive Council.

In the 1930s, some Benin elites established a Benin lodge of the Reformed Ogboni, an organization inspired by freemasonry and started by Yoruba settlers in Lagos. Obaseki became the leader (oluwo) of the group, the group was affiliated with the taxpayers association and went on to dominate politics in Benin Division from 1948 to 1951. Ogbonis were feared by some in the community but it also had progressive views of traditional authority as opposed to Benin traditionalists. During Obaseki’s chairmanship, the Divisional Council passed a motion to reduce the salary of the Oba and to compel the Oba to seek approval before awarding chieftaincy titles to citizens who by the nature of the new titles could become members of the council. However, the council was alleged to be dominated by Ogbonis - who pressured the Native Authority to recruit or promote its own members at the expense of others. The activities of the Ogbonis led to negative reactions from sections of the populace, especially educated youths who had supported Obaseki as Iyase.

In addition, some in Benin saw the Ogboni as an extension of Yoruba domination, especially since leaders of the Ogbonis joined the predominantly Yoruba Action Group in 1951. A rival party, the Otu Edo, was formed to challenge the Ogboni with the mantra of promoting traditional institutions. Otu Edo went on to win the local elections in 1951. However, Obaseki continued his political life in Ibadan and Lagos as a member of the Western House of Assembly and the Legislative Council.

He died in 1956.
