= Edo Broadcasting Service =

Edo Broadcasting System
- Country: Nigeria
- Broadcast area: Edo State
- Headquarters: Benin

Ownership
- Owner: Government of Edo State

History
- Launched: 1978; 48 years ago

Links
- Website: www.ebsng.com

Edo Broadcasting Service (EBS) is a state-owned broadcaster, owned by the government of Edo State. It was founded in 1978 as the state broadcaster for Bendel; its split made it the broadcaster for Edo. Historically, EBS was nicknamed "The Star Station".

== History ==
Federalism in 1978 gave way to the creation of the Nigerian Broadcasting Corporation and the Nigerian Television Authority, and from there, the devolution of the existing state broadcasters. That year, Radio Bendel was established from a former NBC station. Television transmissions were added in early November 1980, when tests were conducted, adopting the name Bendel Television. The two stations were merged in 1986 to form the Bendel Broadcasting Service. Bendel was split up into two states in 1990, Edo and Delta; BBS became EBS and was in charge of broadcasting to the former, while it provisionally offered services to the latter until the Delta Broadcasting Service was established in Asaba.

The television station broadcast on UHF channel 55 from inception until 2024, when it moved to channel 45. The old frequency was withdrawn because it was part of a 700 MHz spectrum auction. This led to some confusion from locals as there was concern that the national regulator withdrew its licence to operate.
