= Low =

Low or LOW or lows, may refer to:

== People ==
- Low (surname), listing people surnamed Low

== Places ==
- Low, Quebec, Canada
- Low, Utah, United States
- Lo Wu station (MTR code LOW), Hong Kong; a rail station
- Salzburg Airport (ICAO airport code: LOWS), Austria

== Music ==
- Low (band), an American indie rock group from Duluth, Minnesota
- Low (English band), an English duo featuring Frankie Goes to Hollywood guitarist Brian Nash

=== Albums ===
- Low (David Bowie album), 1977
- Low (Testament album), 1994
- Low (Low EP), 1994

=== Songs ===
- "Low" (Cracker song), 1993
- "Low" (Flo Rida song), 2007
- "Low" (Foo Fighters song), 2002
- "Low" (Juicy J song), 2014
- "Low" (Kelly Clarkson song), 2003
- "Low" (Lenny Kravitz song), 2018
- "Low" (Sara Evans song), 2008
- "Low" (SZA song), 2022
- "Low", by Camp Mulla
- "Low", by Coldplay from the 2005 album X&Y
- "Low", by I Prevail from the 2019 album Trauma
- "Low", by Inna from her 2015 self-titled album
- "Low", by Marianas Trench from the 2006 album Fix Me
- "Low", by R.E.M. from the 1991 album Out of Time
- "Low", by Silverchair from the 2007 album Young Modern
- "Low", by Sleeping with Sirens from the 2013 album Feel
- "Low", by SZA from the 2022 album SOS
- "Low", is by Wage War
- "Low", by Tech N9ne from the 2009 album K.O.D.
- "Low Low Low", by James from the 1993 album Laid

== Other uses ==
- Launch on warning (LOW)
- Low (complexity), a concept in computational complexity theory
- Low (computability)
- Low (comics), an Image Comics series by Rick Remender and Greg Tocchini
- LOW Festival, a cultural festival
- Low-pressure area, a concept in meteorology
- Louise Weiss building, the seat of the European Parliament
- League of Wales, the top football league in Wales
- Lowe's (NYSE stock ticker symbol LOW)

== See also ==
- LO (disambiguation)
- Löw (disambiguation)
- Löwe (disambiguation)
- Lowe (disambiguation)
