= 羅湖 =

羅湖 (Jyutping: Lo4 wu4) or 罗湖 (pinyin: Luóhú) may refer to:

== Hong Kong ==
- Lo Wu, an area in North District, New Territories
  - Lo Wu Control Point, a Hong Kong immigration control point in Lo Wu
  - Lo Wu station, an MTR station

== Mainland China ==
- Luohu, Shenzhen, a district of Shenzhen
  - Luohu Port, a port of entry in Luohu District
  - Luohu station, a Shenzhen Metro station
