= Lowe =

Lowe may refer to:

== People ==
- Lowe (surname), a list of people with the name
- Liu, a Chinese surname sometimes romanized as Lowe

== Places ==
- Division of Lowe, an Australian federal government electoral division
- Lowe, Delaware, United States
- Lowe Peak (Utah), United States
- Lowe, Shropshire, a location in England
- Lowe Township, Moultrie County, Illinois, United States

== Other uses ==
- Lowe Alpine, American outdoor equipment manufacturer and supplier

- Lowepro, a brand of carrying bags

- Löwe Automobil, German car-part manufacturer
- Lowe (band), Swedish synthpop band
- Lowe and Partners, global advertising agency network, now part of MullenLowe Group
- Löwe, the traditional name of the assistant to the Scharfrichter (executioner)
- Panzer VII Löwe, a German tank

== See also ==
- Lowe Gardens
- Lowe House (disambiguation)
- Lowe's, an American retail chain
- Löw
- Lowes (disambiguation)
- Löwe (disambiguation)
- Low (disambiguation)
