= Lo Wu Bridge =

Bridge between Hong Kong and Shenzhen, China

Coordinates: 22°31′47.4″N 114°6′46.5″E

- Traditional Chinese: 羅湖橋
- Simplified Chinese: 罗湖桥
Transcriptions
Standard Mandarin
- Hanyu Pinyin: Luóhúqiáo
Yue: Cantonese
- Jyutping: lo4 wu4 kiu4

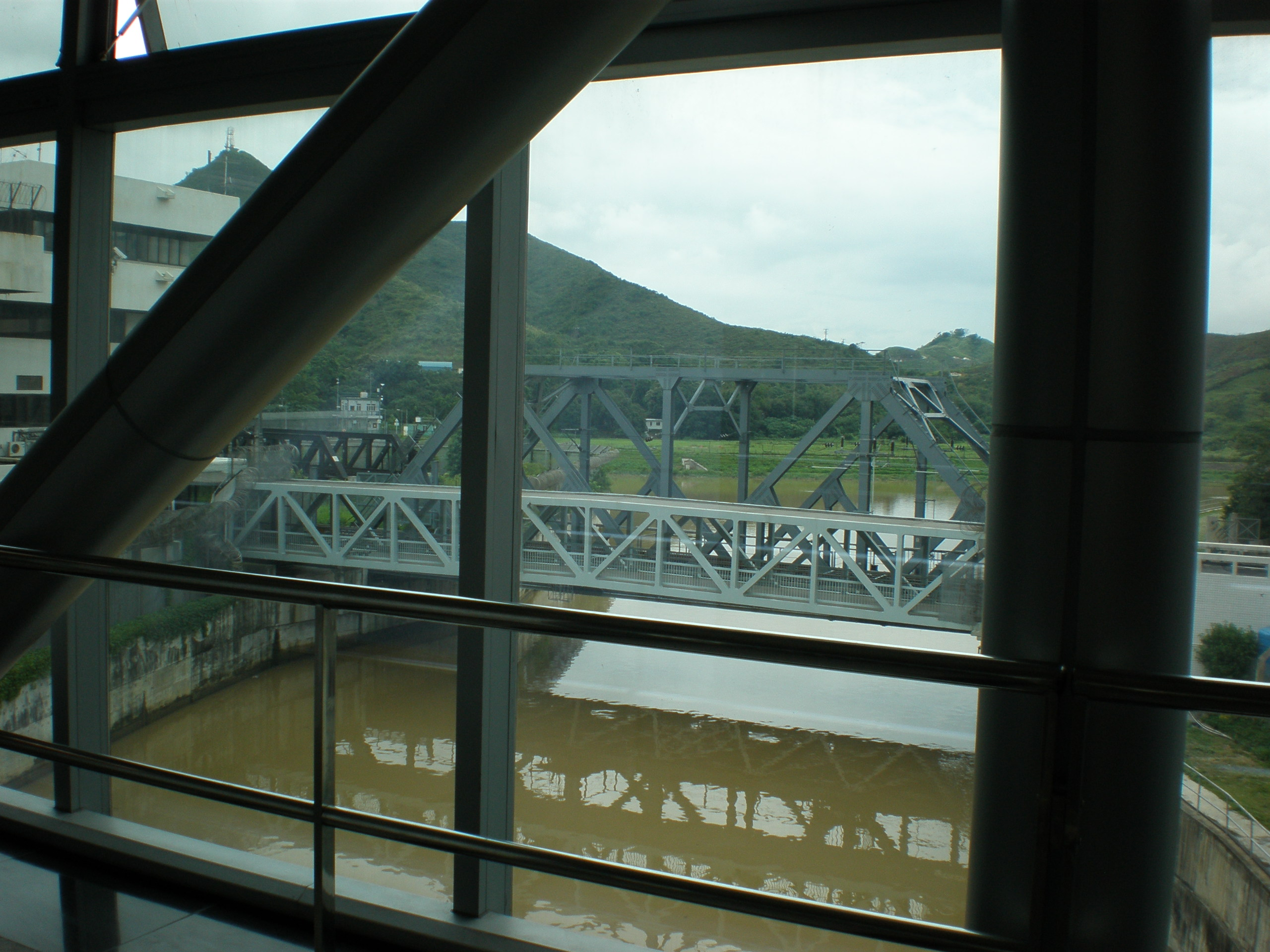
Bridges at Lo Wu over the Sham Chun River in 2008. Viewed from the pedestrian bridge.

The Lo Wu Bridge (simplified Chinese: 罗湖桥; traditional Chinese: 羅湖橋) is a footbridge and steel railway truss bridge across Sham Chun River linking Hong Kong and Shenzhen.

Due to the course of widening the river section at Lo Wu, it is necessary to reconstruct the Lo Wu railway bridge as its span is not long enough for the widened river section. The old Lo Wu railway bridge has been relocated downstream in September 2003 to facilitate the construction of a new bridge for the widened Shenzhen River Lo Wu section. Owing to its historical value, the old rail bridge will be preserved as a monument on the bank of the Sham Chun River adjacent to the Lo Wu station. The whole bridge was relocated without any change of the existing features, and the shifting of the bridge across the existing railway line was the most difficult part of the operation. The government said damage to the existing bridge structure will be minimal.

A smaller truss bridge now carries rail traffic between Lo Wu Control Point/Lo Wu station with Luohu station.

The current Lo Wu pedestrian bridge is an enclosed 2-storey walkway and replaced a partially covered pedestrian walkway built in 1985 and another truss bridge so pedestrians need not cross the border over the tracks.
