= Lowi =

Lowi may refer to:

- Theodore J. Lowi (1931–2017), American political scientist
- Innsbruck Airport, Austria (ICAO code: LOWI)

== See also ==
- Loewi, another surname
- Lowy
- Loewy
