= Lo Wu station =

MTR station in the New Territories, Hong Kong

Lo Wu 羅湖
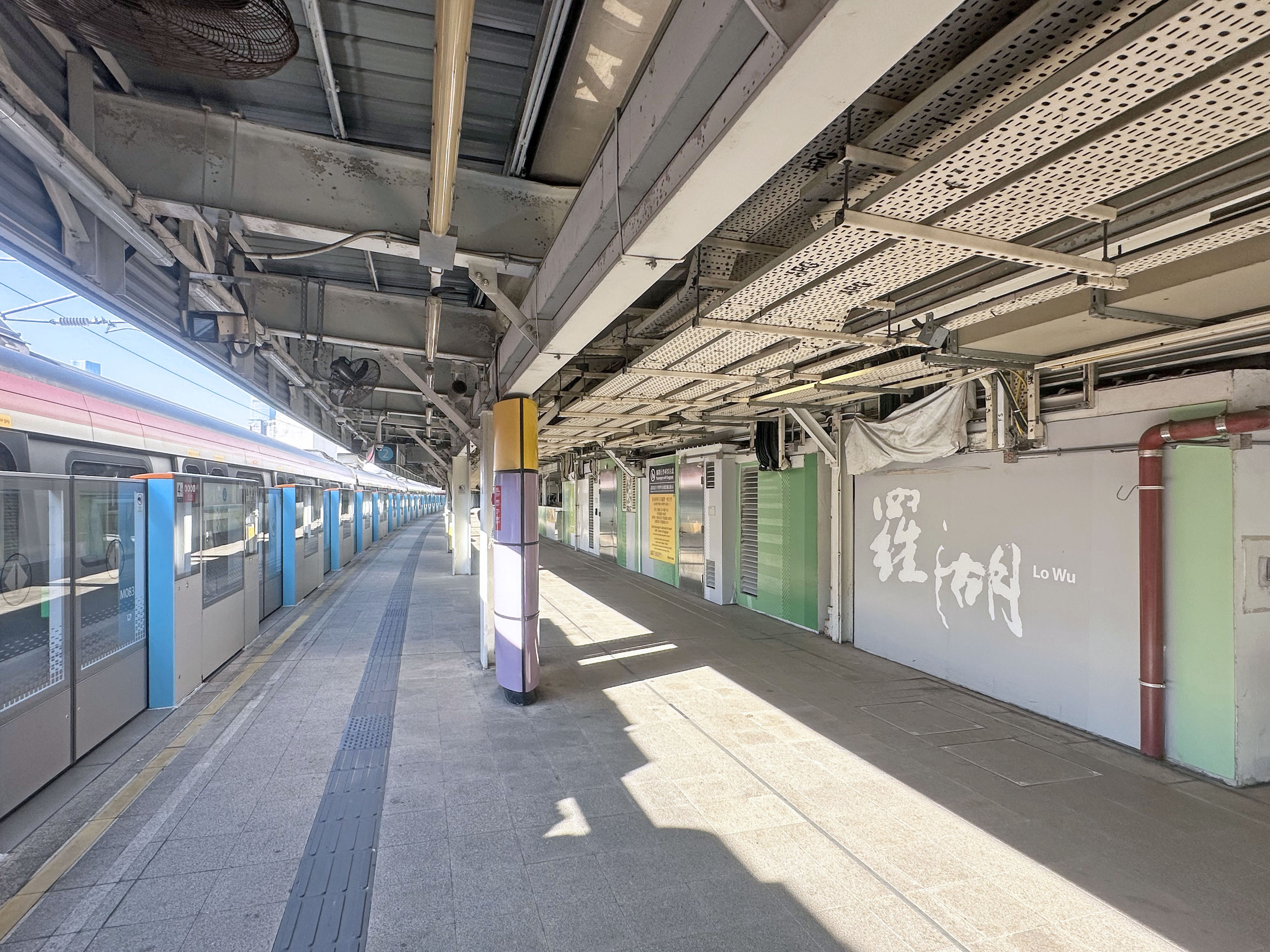
- Lo Wu Platform

Chinese name
- Traditional Chinese: 羅湖
- Simplified Chinese: 罗湖
- Jyutping: lo4wu4
- Hanyu Pinyin: Luóhú
Transcriptions
Standard Mandarin
- Hanyu Pinyin: Luóhú
Yue: Cantonese
- Yale Romanization: Lòwù
- IPA: [lɔ˩wu˩]
- Jyutping: lo4wu4

General information
- Location: Lo Wu Station Road, Lo Wu; North District, Hong Kong
- Coordinates: 22°31′42″N 114°06′48″E
- System: MTR rapid transit station
- Owner: Kowloon-Canton Railway Corporation
- Operator: MTR Corporation
- Line: East Rail line
- Platforms: 4 (Spanish solution: 2 side platforms and 1 island platform)
- Tracks: 2 (East Rail Line); 1 (Non-stop intercity through trains)
- Connections: Lo Wu Control Point and Luohu Port; Shenzhen railway station; Line 1 (Luohu); Exit A2: Line 9 (Renmin South); Exit A1, B

Construction
- Structure type: At-grade
- Platform levels: 1
- Accessible: Yes

Other information
- Status: Operational since 6 February 2023
- Station code: LOW

History
- Opened: 14 October 1949; 76 years ago
- Electrified: 15 July 1983; 43 years ago

Passengers
- 2012: 240,000 daily entries and exits

Services
Preceding station	MTR	Following station
Sheung Shui towards Admiralty	East Rail line	Terminus
Across mainland China–Hong Kong border
Preceding station	Shenzhen Metro	Following station
Guomao towards Airport East	Line 1 transfer at Luohu	Terminus
Xiangxicun towards Wenjin	Line 9 transfer at Renmin South	Ludancun towards Qianwan

Former services
Preceding station	KCR	Following station
Sheung Shui towards Kowloon	KCR British section	Terminus
Track layout
Location
- Location within MTR

Lo Wu is the northern terminus of the East Rail line (Kowloon-Canton Railway) of Hong Kong, located in Lo Wu within the Closed Area on Hong Kong's northern frontier. The station serves as a primary checkpoint for rail passengers between Hong Kong and mainland China and vice versa, rather than serving a specific area. It is also the northernmost railway station in Hong Kong. Its lineage is light green and grey.

== History ==
=== Initial opening ===
When the Kowloon–Canton Railway (KCR) first went into service, trains did not stop at Lo Wu, as there was no border patrol at the time. However, shortly after the People's Republic of China was created in October 1949, the KCR announced that trains would terminate at Lo Wu, and that passengers would be able to cross the border on foot.

After the economic reformation of China, through trains re-commenced running in 1979, and cross-border traffic increased substantially. During the 1980s, Lo Wu station was completely redeveloped. On 15 January 1987, the new Lo Wu station was formally opened.

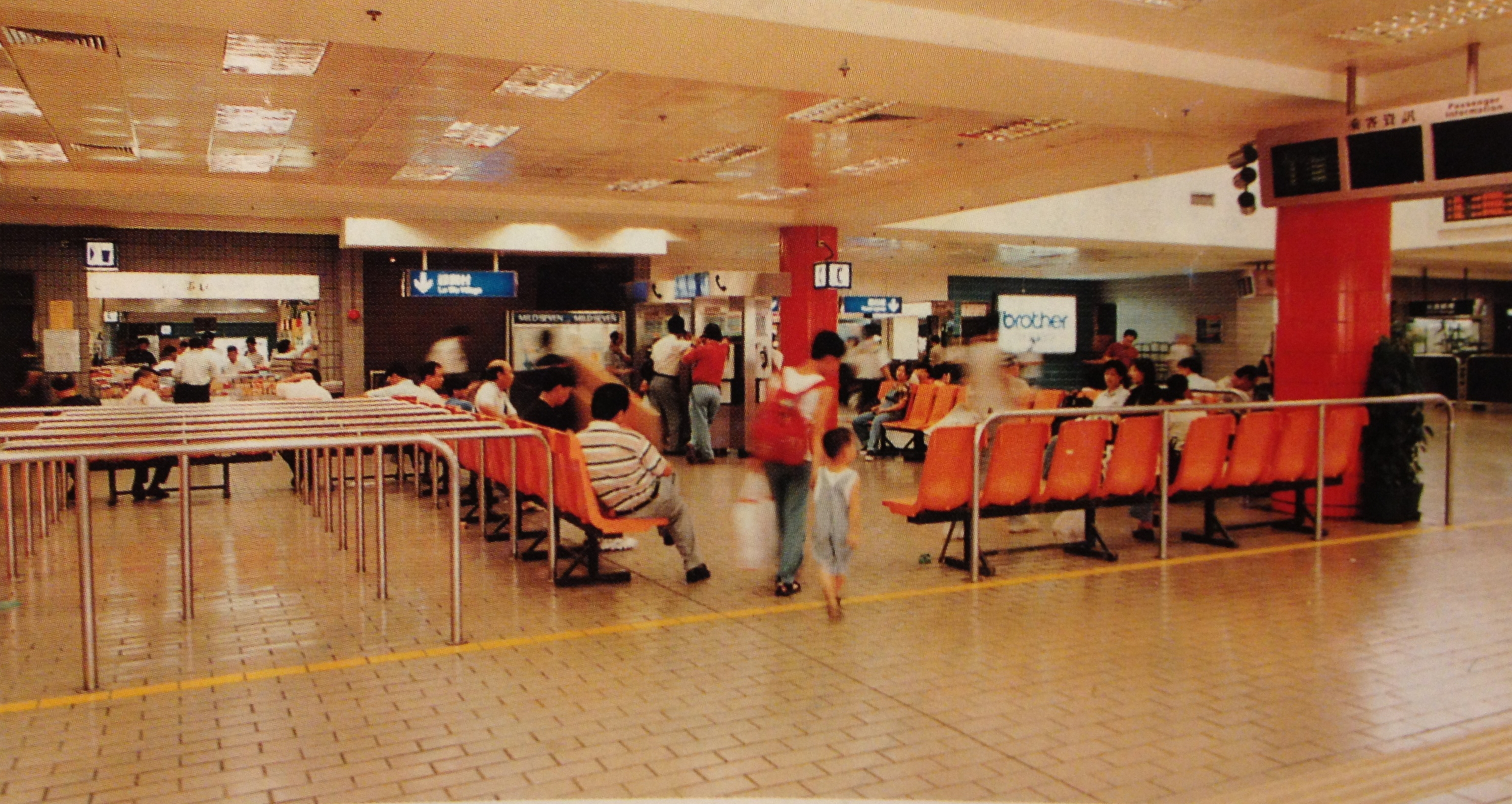
Station concourse in 1997.

=== Refurbishment work ===
Refurbishment work of the station started in 2002, and new facilities such as a group waiting area and new ticket gates were introduced. Since 28 December 2004, this station also serves as the interchange station for the Shenzhen Metro Luohu station, which shares the same Chinese name.

In 2009, platform gap fillers were trialled on platforms.

=== Closure during COVID-19 ===
Following the Government's measures to contain the outbreak of COVID-19, this station was closed from 4 February 2020. This station provided 30-minute-interval train services between Lo Wu and Sheung Shui stations for Lo Wu residents only. This station remained closed to border crossing passengers as construction around the area was not completed yet. Instead, from 8 January 2023, border crossing residents were asked to use Lok Ma Chau station instead.

=== Opening during Ching Ming and Chung Yeung Festivals ===
To make it easier to go to Sandy Ridge for grave sweeping, for a month around Ching Ming Festival and Chung Yeung Festival, some East Rail line trains operated to/from this station from the start of service until 7 pm every day.

=== Re-opening of station for Cross-Border Travel ===
On 6 February 2023, the MTR resumed Cross-Border Travel with the Mainland at Luohu Port, with train frequencies ranging from four to eight minutes.

== Station layout ==
The station has three tracks. Two tracks serve the East Rail line as its terminus. The other track serves intercity through train services which do not stop at this station and continues northward across the border into mainland China. The through trains do not have platforms on this station.

The East Rail station features two tracks with two side platforms and an island platform arranged in a Spanish solution. The island platforms (2 and 3) serve alighting passengers, while the side platforms (1 and 4) serve boarding passengers. The island platform connects to the departure concourse at G, and the side platforms are connected to the arrival concourse by escalators and lifts at U1. Both concourses are connected to the Lo Wu Control Point, through the Lo Wu Bridge which has moving walkways.

Trains entering the station will first open doors facing the island platform to allow passengers to alight. After station staff has confirmed that all passengers have alighted, the doors will close and doors facing the side platforms (1 and 4) will be opened for boarding passengers.

Prior to the implementation of the Spanish solution, passengers on both tracks would use the island platforms for both boarding and alighting, resulting in the platform overcrowding. In 2004, platform 1 (which had previously been rarely used) was rebuilt and platform 4 was constructed to improve the passenger flow for boarding passengers.

Located inside the paid area of the arrivals concourse (U2) are two separate passageways providing access to escalators, lifts, and stairs to one of the two side platforms (1 and 4). Large glass sliding doors ahead of each passageway begin automatically closing around 5 minutes before the train is set to depart the station. This is done to control the number of boarding passengers allowed on each narrow side platform to prevent overcrowding and reduces the chance of passengers falling onto the tracks. Once a set of automatic doors are shut, the other set will open, allowing access to the other side platform.

U2	Arrival Concourse	Upper Level Concourse (Mainland China to Hong Kong)	Hong Kong Immigration Department and Customs and Excise Department checkpoints, Customer Service, HK Tourism Commission Office, shops
U1	Departure Concourse	Ground Level Concourse (Hong Kong to mainland China)	Fare adjustment, Immigration Department and Customs and Excise Department checkpoints, duty-free shop, Luohu Port, Lo Wu resident exit
G	Platforms	← Decommissioned track and locked to prevent unauthorised access →
G	Platforms	Side platform (boarding), doors will open on the right for entering
G	Platforms	Platform; 1 ↑ / 2 ↓	← East Rail line towards Admiralty (Sheung Shui)
G	Platforms	Island platform (alighting), doors will open on the left, right for exit
G	Platforms	Platform; 3 ↑ / 4 ↓	← East Rail line towards Admiralty (Sheung Shui)
G	Platforms	Side platform (boarding), doors will open on the left for entering

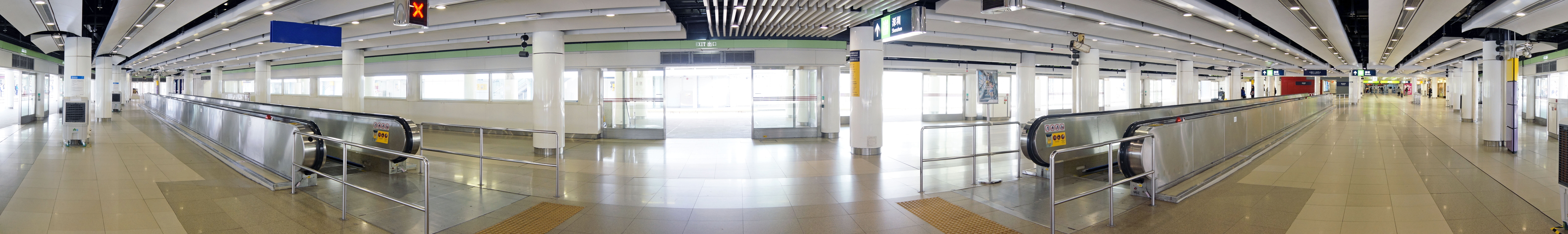
Panorama of the central passageway from the platform to the border checkpoint

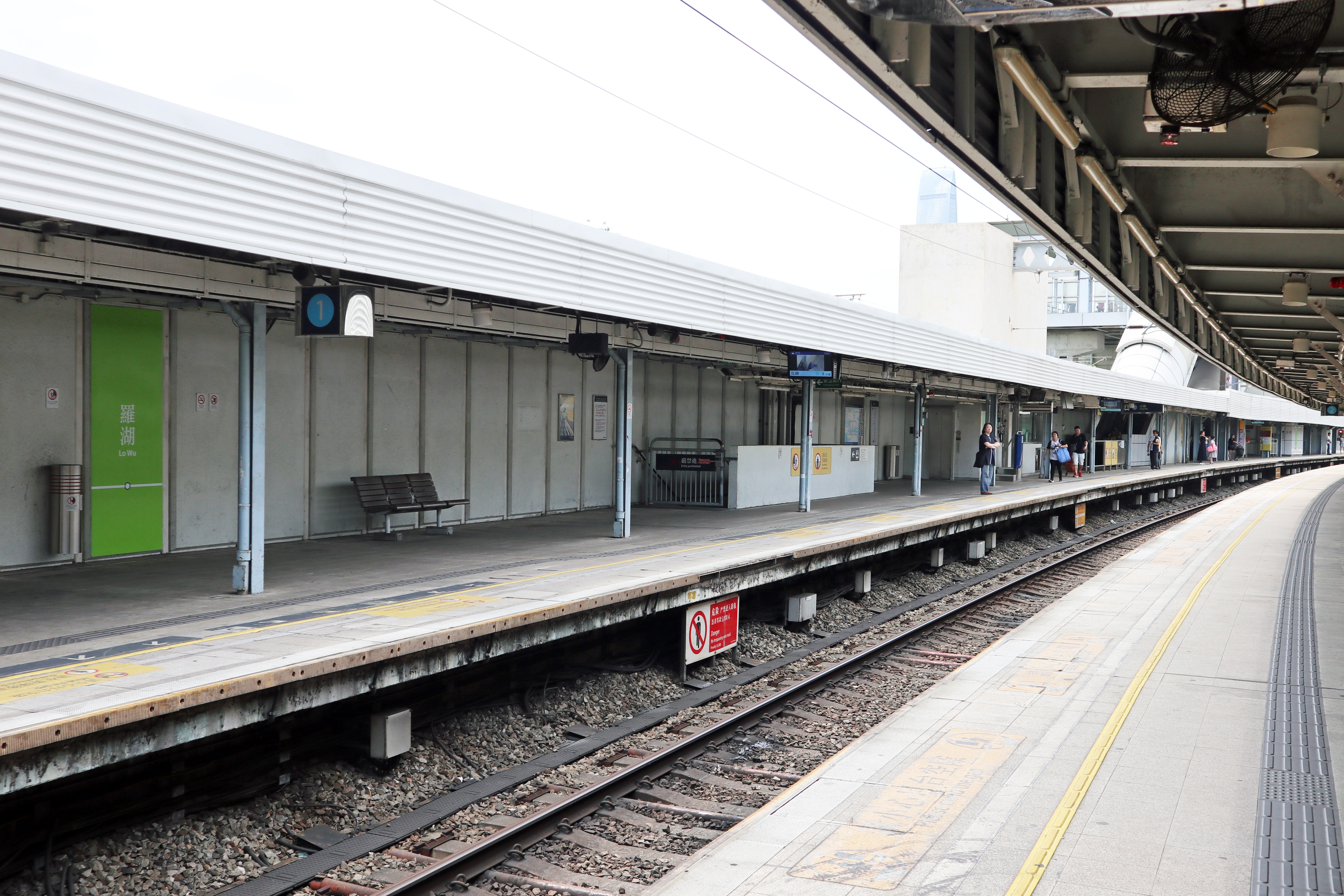
Platform 1 (left) and 2 (right) (April 2019)

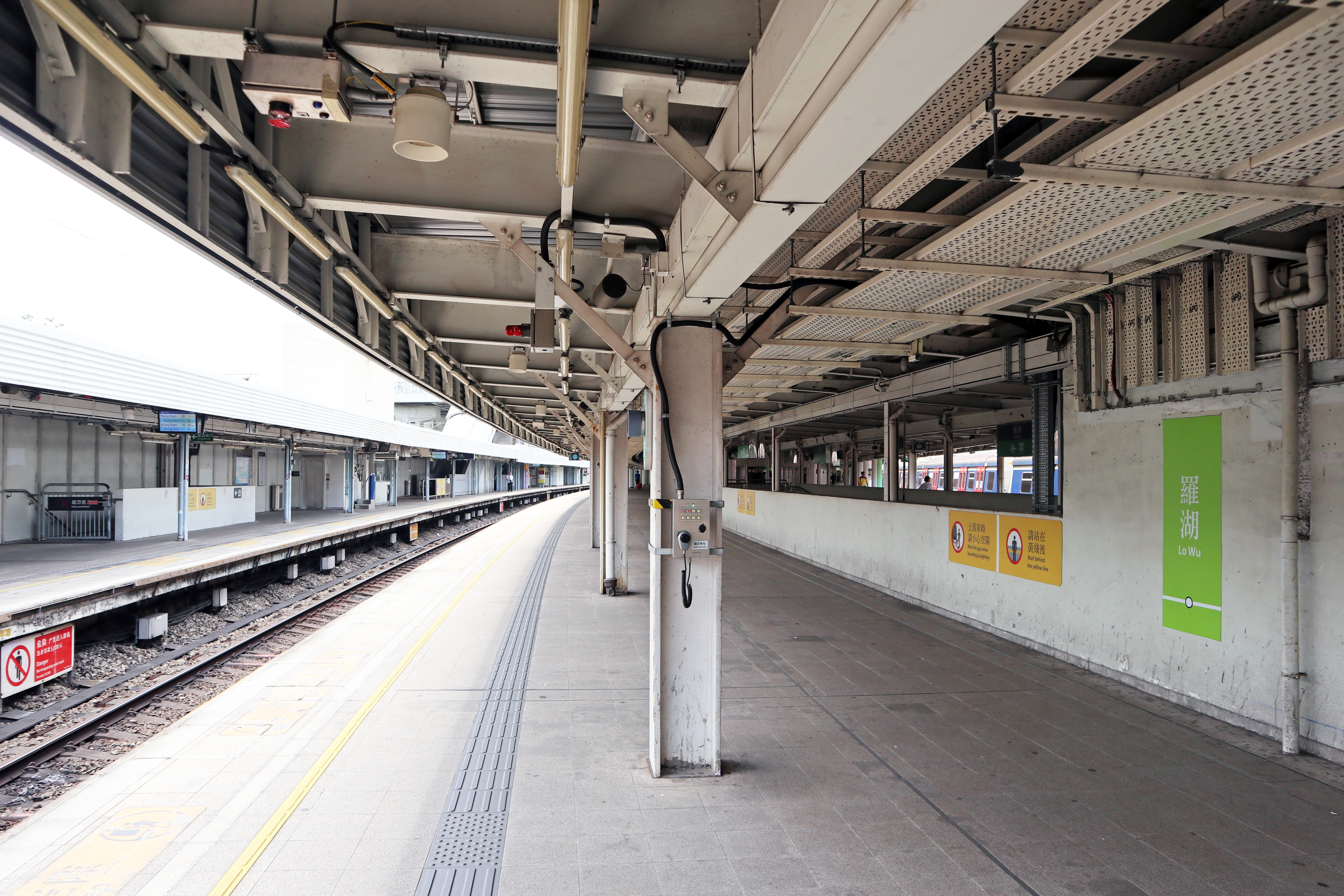
Platform 3 (left) and 4 (right) (April 2019)

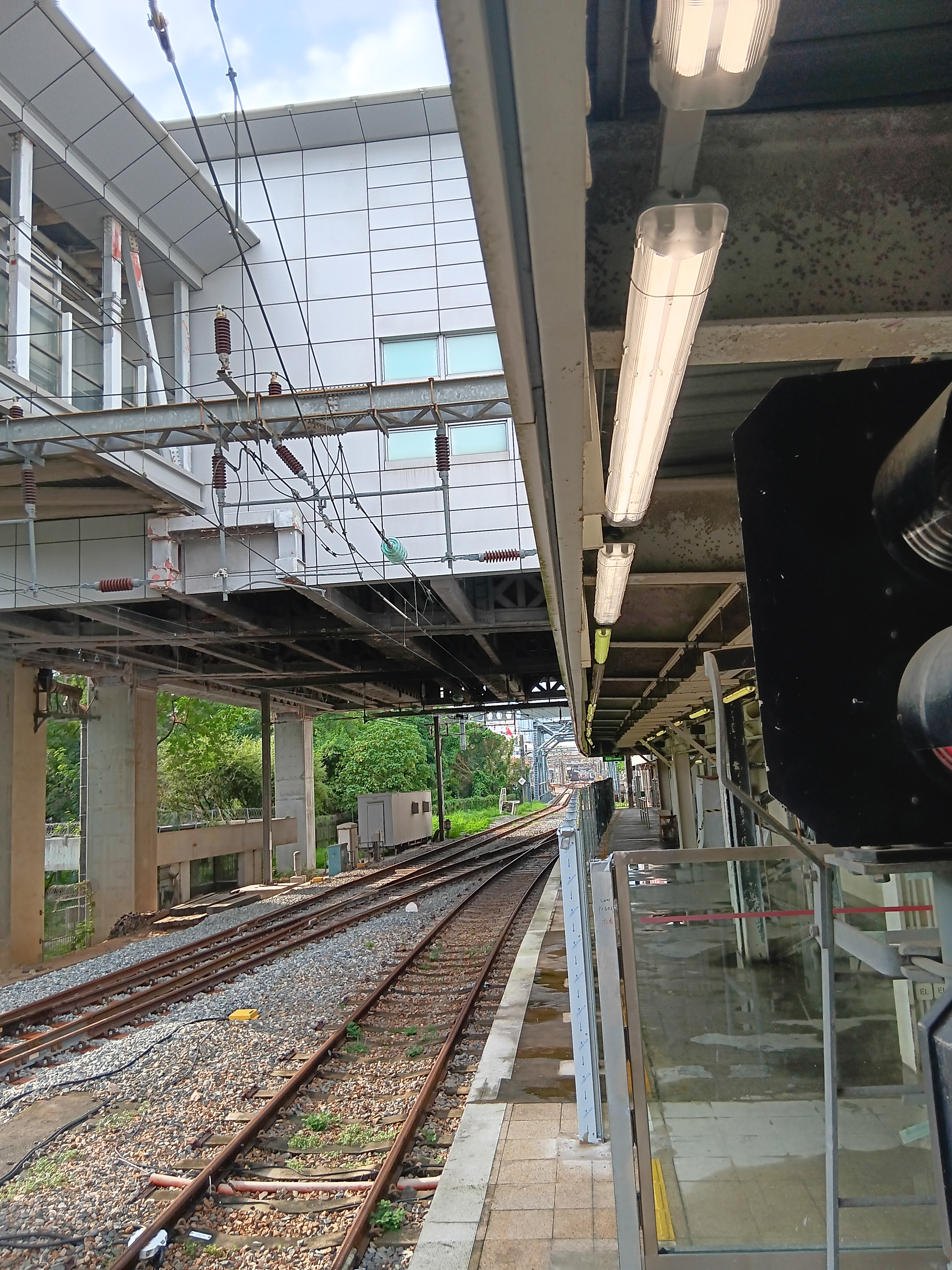
Tracks towards Shenzhen seen from platform 2

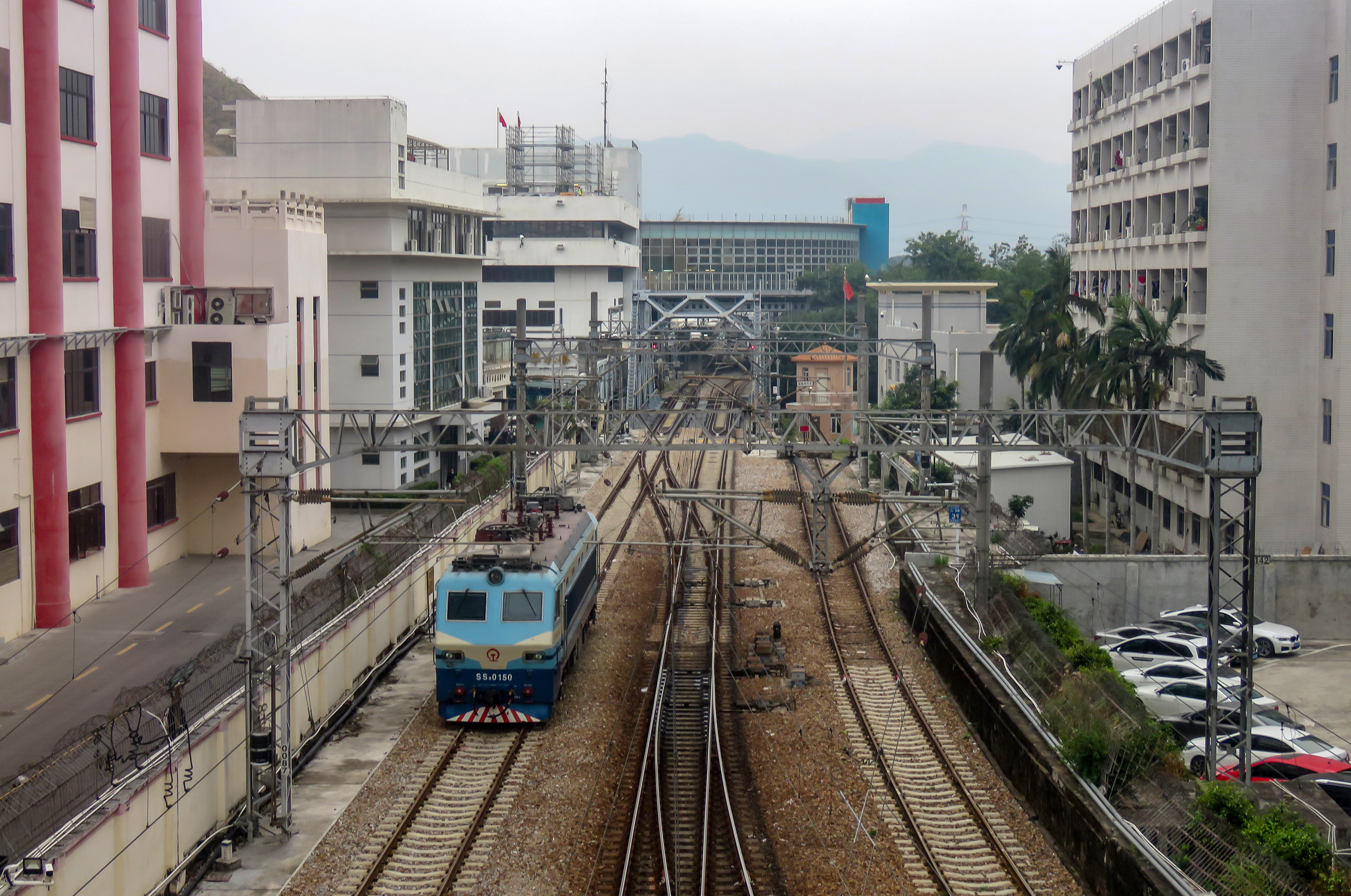
A locomotive heading towards a reversing siding. Lo Wu station in the background (January 2019)

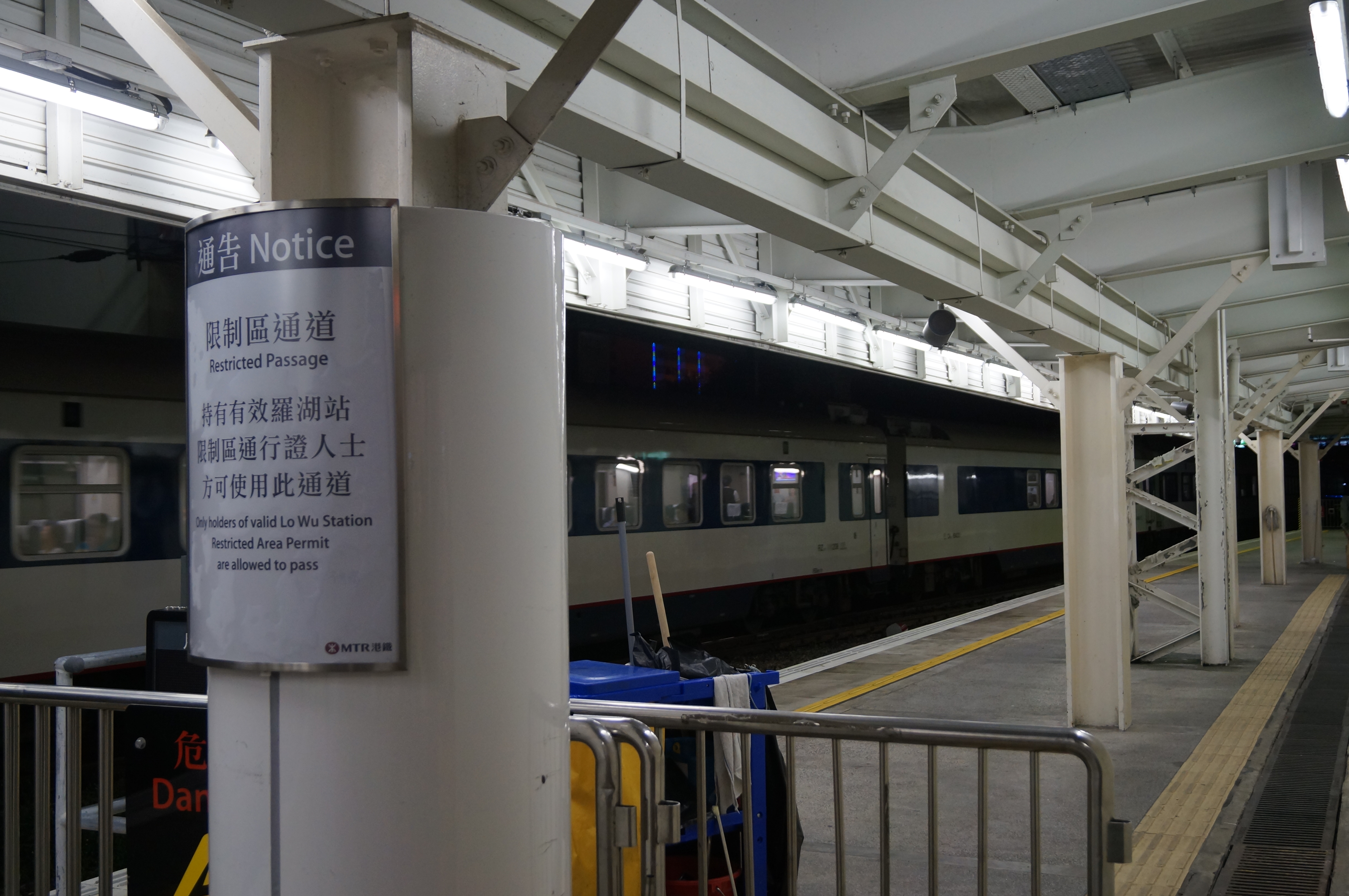
Passage restricted only to Lo Wu residents, featuring an Intercity Through Train in the background. (August 2013)

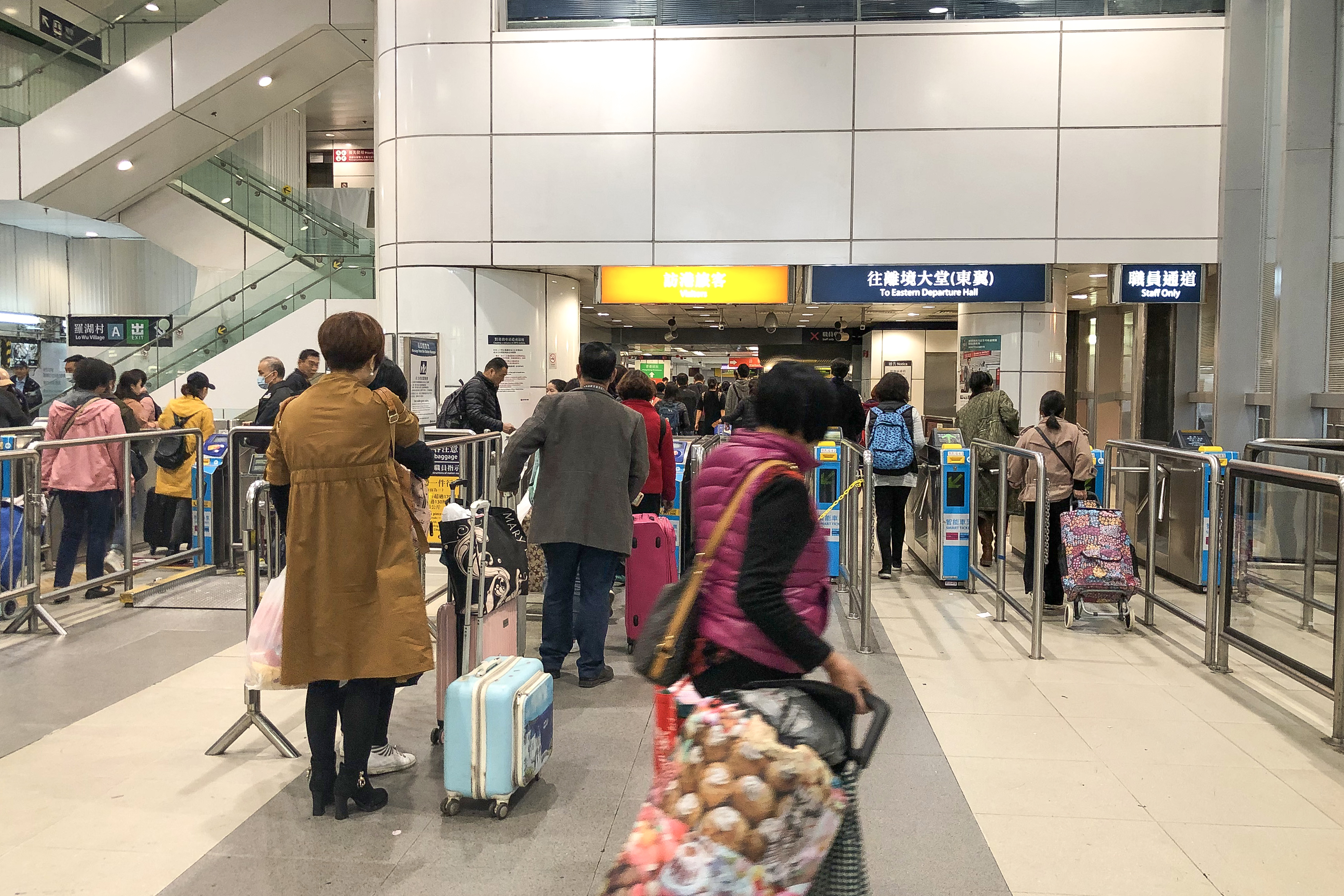
Arrival exit fare gates for leaving Lo Wu station and towards the Luohu Port border checkpoint. On the left is exit A, available only to permit holders of Lo Wu residents. (January 2019)

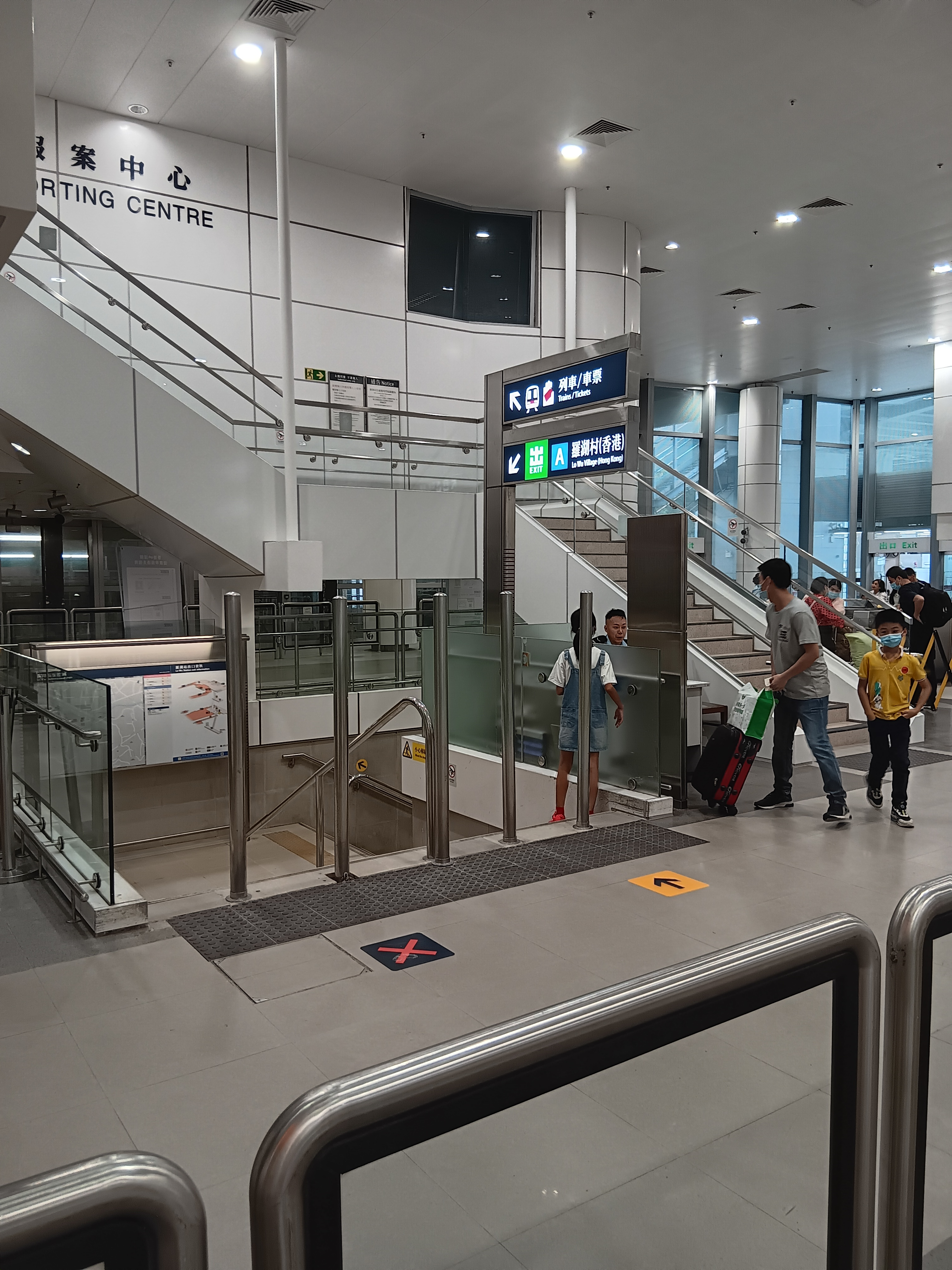
Exit A seen from the departure concourse (July 2023)

=== Exits ===
The station has three exits:

Exit	Destinations	Note
Departure Exit	Lo Wu Immigration Control Point, Luohu Port	The Lo Wu Immigration Control Point, where passengers must go through the border checkpoint in order to enter mainland China. Passengers must have valid travel documents to use this exit. Luohu Port (Shenzhen Metro Line 1: Luohu station, Line 9: Renmin South station and Shenzhen railway station)
Arrival Exit	Lo Wu Immigration Control Point, Luohu Port	The Lo Wu Immigration Control Point, where passengers must go through the border checkpoint in order to enter mainland China. Passengers must have valid travel documents to use this exit. Luohu Port (Shenzhen Metro Line 1: Luohu station, Line 9: Renmin South station and Shenzhen railway station)
A1	Tak Yuet Lau, Liu Pok Village	Two exits out to the Lo Wu area. These two exits are guarded by Hong Kong police officers. To use this exit, one must possess a Lo Wu Resident Card or a Closed Area Permit, which can be obtained at the Sheung Shui Police Station in Fanling.
A2	Lo Wu Village, Sandy Ridge Cemetery	Two exits out to the Lo Wu area. These two exits are guarded by Hong Kong police officers. To use this exit, one must possess a Lo Wu Resident Card or a Closed Area Permit, which can be obtained at the Sheung Shui Police Station in Fanling.

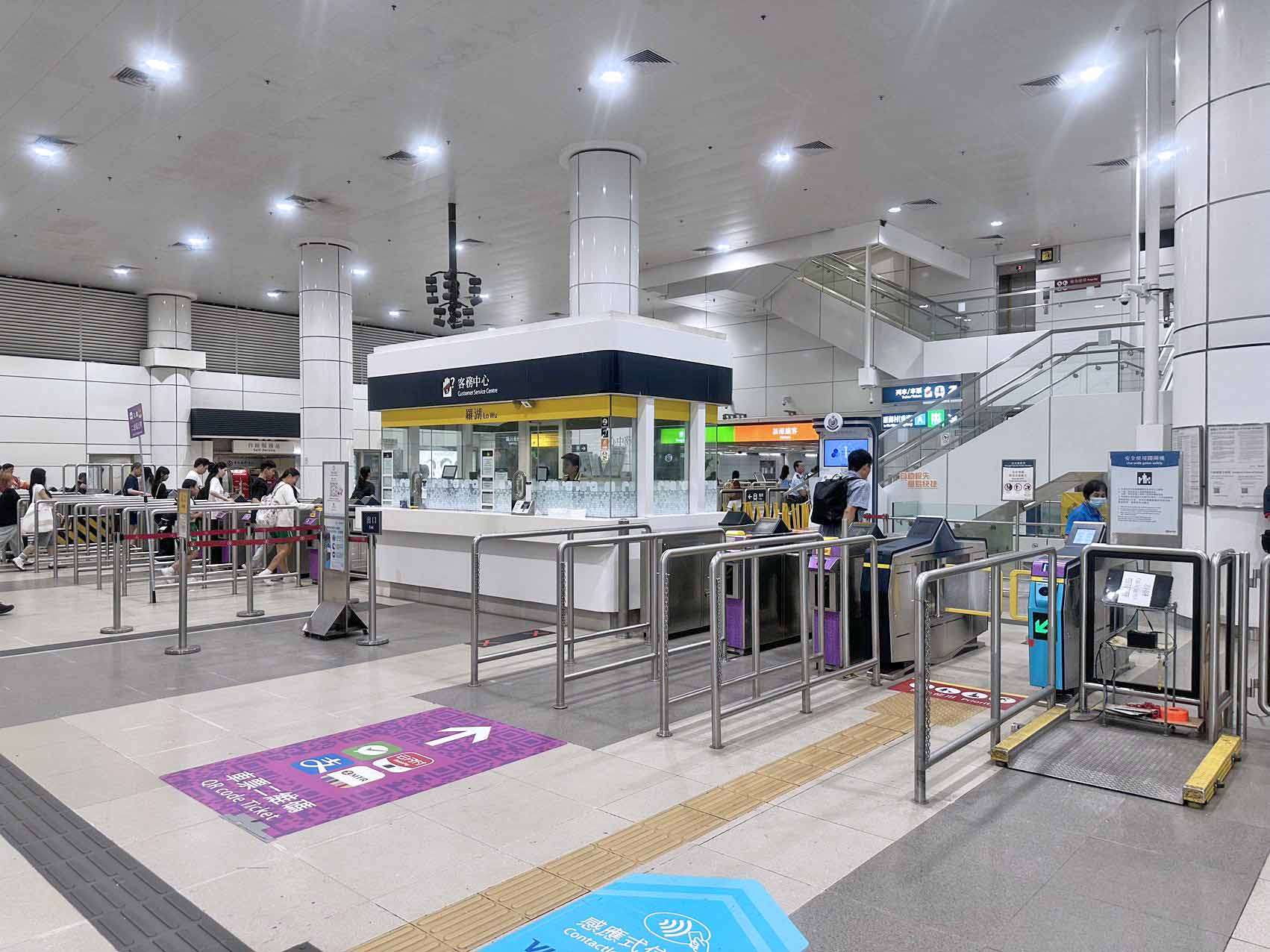
Departure Exit (November 2024)

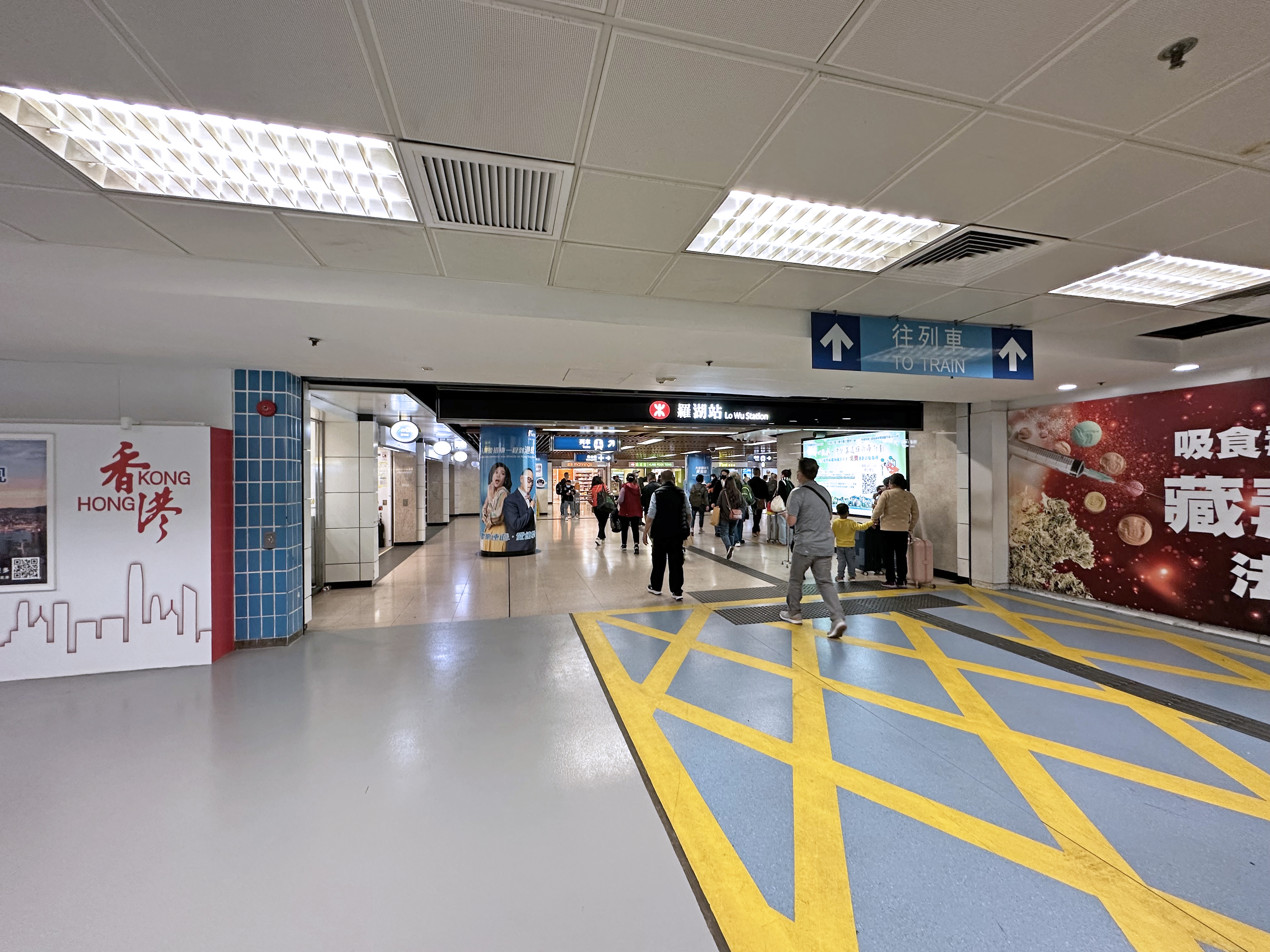
Arrival Exit (February 2023)

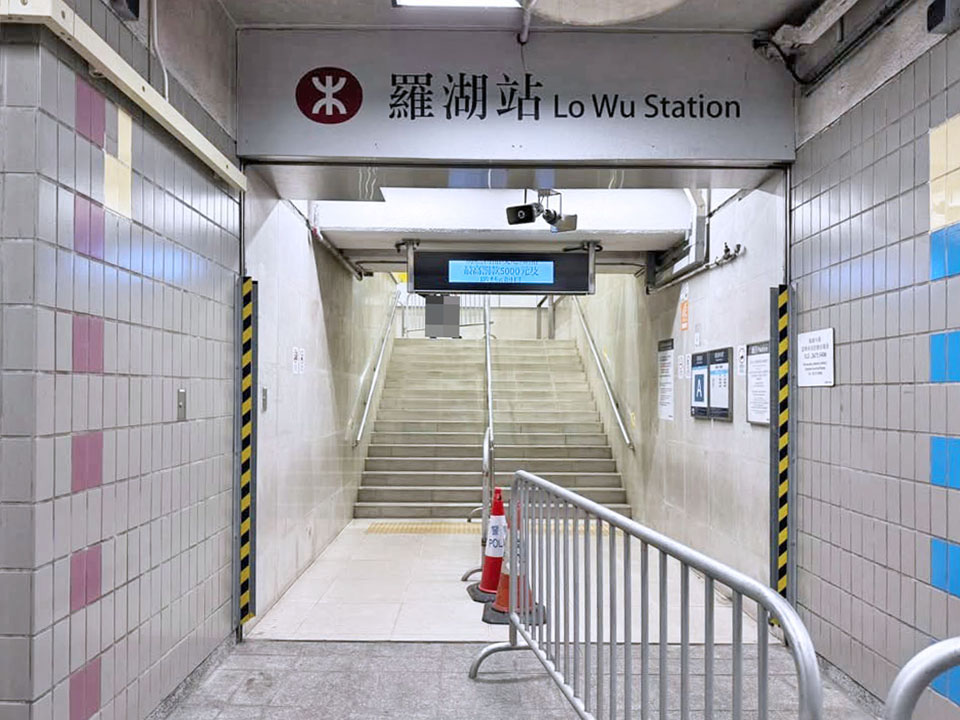
Exit A underground entrance (April 2025)

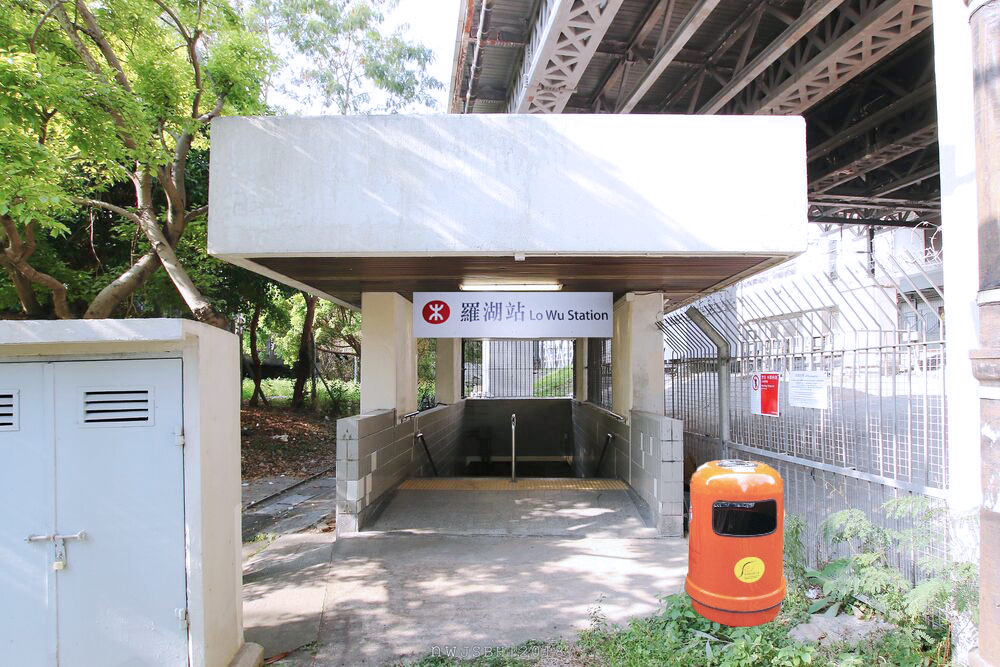
Exit A ground-level entrance (June 2018)

== Incidents ==
On 2 February 2020, two explosive devices were found at Lo Wu station.

== See also ==
- Lo Wu
- Lo Wu Bridge
- Lo Wu Control Point
- Luohu (Shenzhen side)
- Luohu station (Shenzhen side)
