= Sandy Ridge Cemetery =

Cemetery in Sandy Ridge, Hong Kong

Coordinates: 22.52531°N 114.11956°E

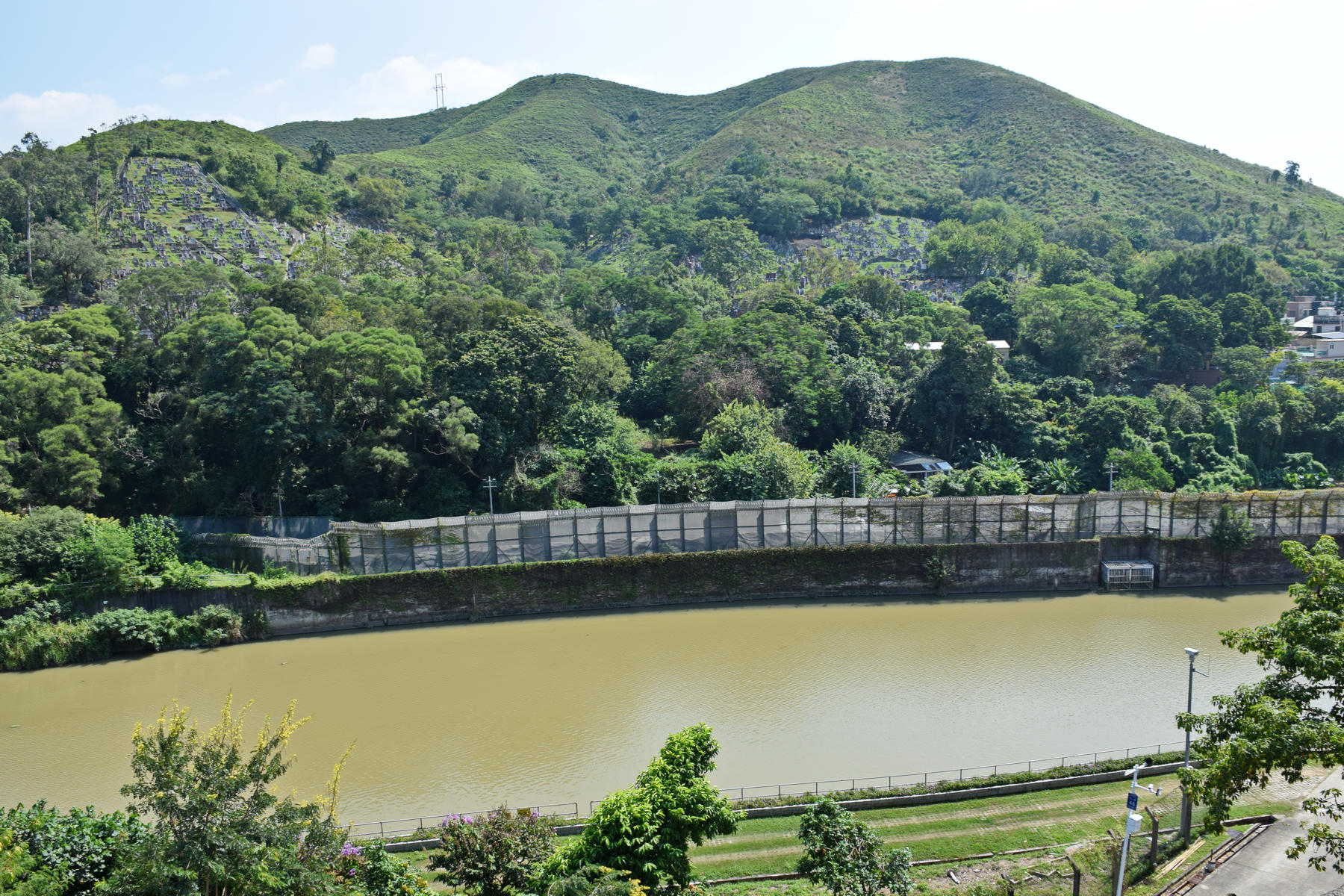
Sandy Ridge Cemetery viewed across Sham Chun River as seen from Luohu Port

Sandy Ridge Cemetery (Chinese: 沙嶺墳場) is a cemetery in Sandy Ridge, Hong Kong near Man Kam To and next to Lo Wu Control Point. It is managed by Food and Environmental Hygiene Department. It lies on the slopes between Sandy Ridge and Lo Wu Station Road.

== History ==
The cemetery started construction in 1949 and was opened to the public in 1950. At the time, it consisted of four coffin sections: Little Sister of the Poor, Roman Catholic Church, Sha Ling (general) and Tung Wah. It is also a final home for unclaimed human remains which were transferred from various cemeteries which had ceased operation, such as Kai Lung Wan East Cemetery, New Kowloon Cemetery No.7, New Stanley Cemetery, Sham Wan Cemetery and Shek O Cemetery.

However, during the Ching Ming and Chung Yeung festivals, people outside the area do not need to apply for the Closed Area Permit to enter. From 4 January 2016, due to the reduction of the Frontier Closed Area, it is no longer in the restricted area. From then on, people can go to the cemetery without holding a Closed Area Permit.

In April 2021, it was announced that Sandy Ridge Cemetery will be expanded to yield more than 200,000 niche plots and stage 17,800 annual cremations that could be used instead for other industries that could promote collaboration with neighbouring cities such as Shenzhen.

== See also ==
- List of cemeteries in Hong Kong
