= Tak Yuet Lau =

Village in Ta Kwu Ling, Hong Kong

Coordinates: 22.528021°N 114.109248°E

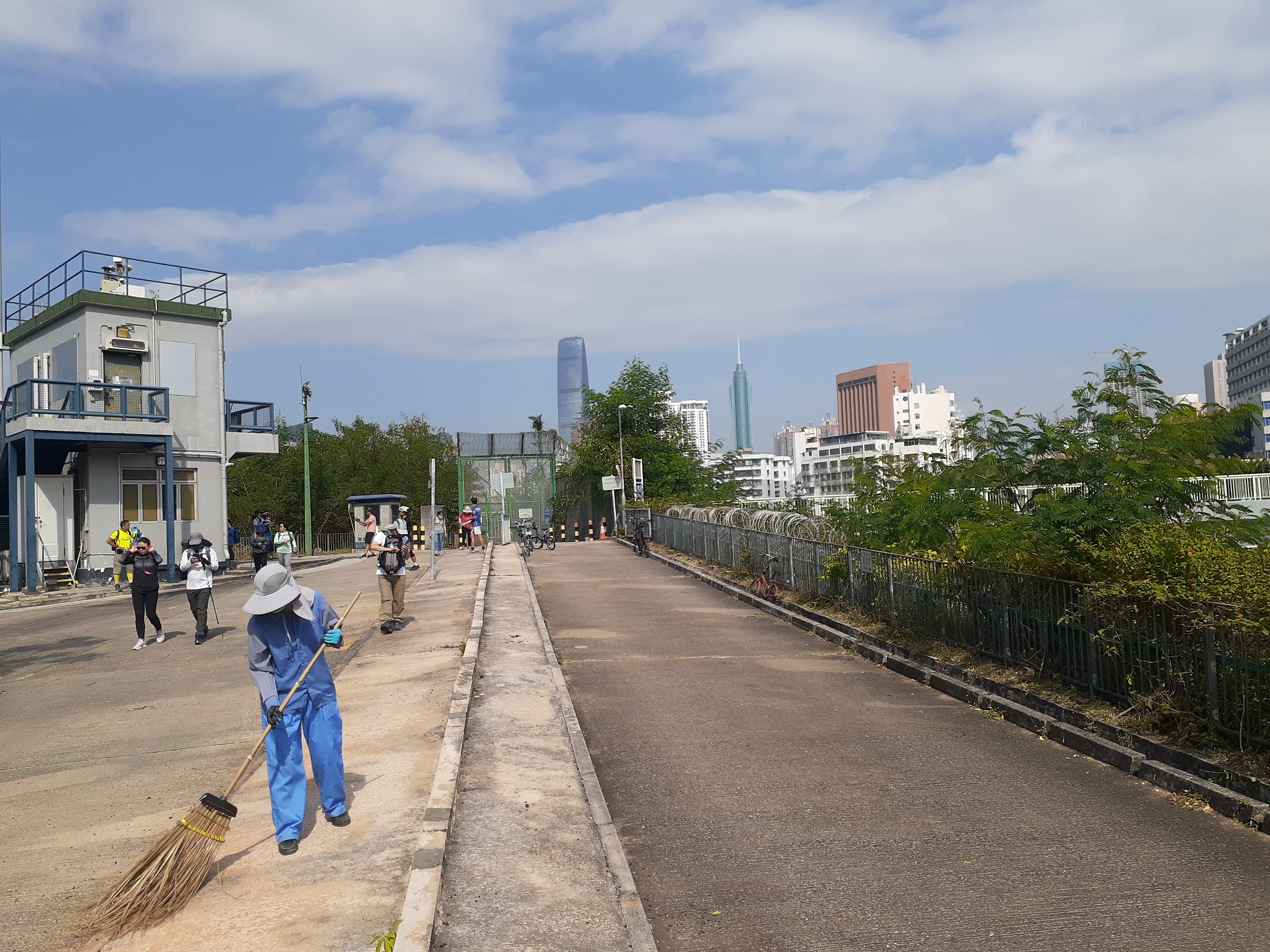
Tak Yuet Lau Police Post (得月樓警崗) near the Ng Tung River, in the Lo Wu area of Hong Kong. The Shenzhen skyline is visible in the background.

Tak Yuet Lau (Chinese: 得月樓) is a village in the Lo Wu area of North District, Hong Kong.
