= Loewy =

Loewy (or Löwy) is a surname, and may refer to:

== People ==
- Albert Löwy (1816–1908), British Hebrew scholar and religious leader
- Alfred Loewy (1873–1935), German mathematician
- Emanuel Löwy (1857–1938), Austrian archaeologist and theorist
- Jacob Ezekiel Löwy (1814–1864), Silesian rabbi and author
- Josef Löwy (1834–1902), Austrian photographer
- Maurice Loewy (1833–1907), French astronomer
- Michael Löwy (born 1938), French-Brazilian sociologist and philosopher
- Raymond Loewy (1893–1986), French-born American industrial designer
- Robert Loewy (1926–2025), American aerospace engineer
- Slavko Löwy (1904–1996), Croatian architect

== Other ==
- Loewy (crater)

== See also ==
- Loewi
- Lowy
- Löwe (disambiguation) (from Yehuda-Leyb)
