= Lowy =

Ashkenazi Jewish surname

Lowy (also spelled Löwy or Lőwy) is a surname of Ashkenazi Jewish origin. Some families originated in parts of Poland. It may refer to:

- Albert Löwy (1816–1908), British Hebrew scholar and religious leader
- Benjamin Lowy (born 1979), American photographer
- David Lowy, Australian businessman and musician, son of Frank
- David A. Lowy, American judge
- Dóra Lőwy (born 1977), Hungarian handball player
- Douglas R. Lowy (born 1942), American doctor
- Emanuel Löwy (1857–1938), Austrian archaeologist
- Frank Lowy (born 1930), Australian businessman
- Frederick Lowy (born 1933), Canadian educator
- Fritzi Löwy (1910–1994), Austrian swimmer
- Gertrude Golda Lowy (1887–1982), English suffragette
- Isaac Lowy (1793–1847), Hungarian businessman
- Meshulim Feish Lowy (1921–2015), Hungarian rabbi
- Michael Löwy (born 1938), Brazilian sociologist
- Otto Lowy (1921–2002), Canadian actor and radio host
- Slavko Löwy (1904–1996), Croatian architect
- Steven Lowy (born 1962), Australian businessman
- Yitzchak Lowy (1887–1942), Polish actor

== See also ==
- Lowy Institute for International Policy
- Loewy
- Lowi (disambiguation)
