= Loewi =

Loewi is a surname, and may refer to:

- Fiona Loewi (born 1975), Canadian actress
- Otto Loewi (1873–1961), German-born pharmacologist and psychobiologist

== See also ==
- Lowi (disambiguation)
- Loewy
- Löwe (disambiguation)
