= Loews =

Loews may refer to:

- Loews Cineplex Entertainment, formerly Loews Incorporated, a defunct North American cinema chain which formerly owned Metro-Goldwyn-Mayer
  - United States v. Loew's Inc., a United States Supreme Court case involving Loews
  - Loew's Grand Theatre, a movie theater in Atlanta
- Loews Corporation, an American holding company
- Loews Hotels, a North American hotel chain

== See also ==
- Lowe's, an American home improvement store chain
- Lowes (disambiguation)
- Loew
