= Sandy Ridge, Hong Kong =

Hill in Hong Kong

Coordinates: 22.528513°N 114.118493°E

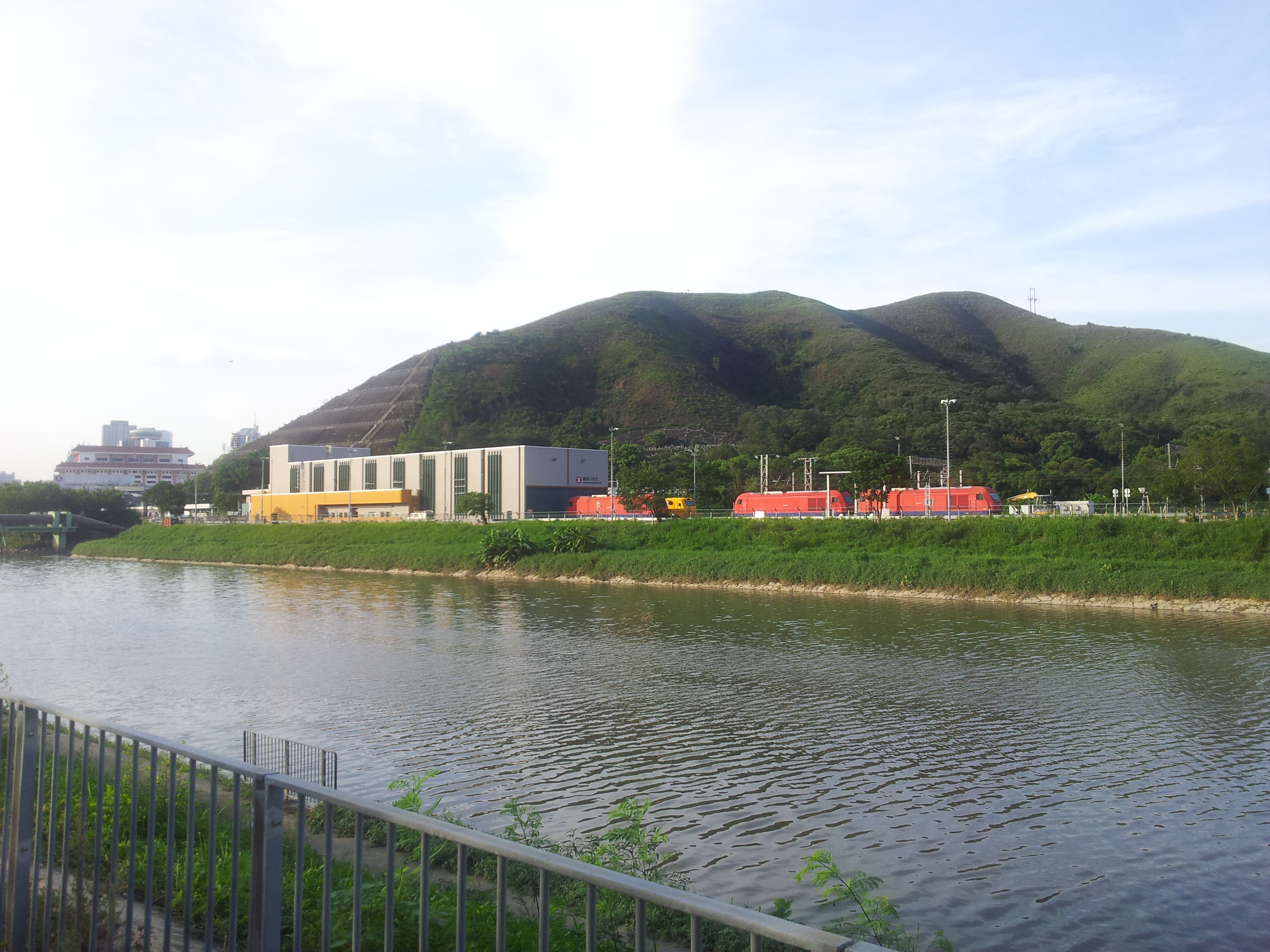
Sandy Ridge and Ng Tung River.

Sandy Ridge (traditional Chinese: 沙嶺; simplified Chinese: 沙岭; Jyutping: saa^{1} ling^{5}; Cantonese Yale: Sā Líhng; pinyin: Shā Lǐng), is a hill on the east side of Lo Wu in the New Territories, Hong Kong. The village of Sha Ling (沙嶺), is located south of the hill besides Man Kam To Road. Sandy Ridge is completely within the Frontier Closed Area of Hong Kong adjacent to the territory's border with Shenzhen in mainland China.

== Local council ==
For electoral purposes, Sandy Ridge is part of the Sha Ta constituency of the North District Council. It is currently represented by Ko Wai-kei, who was elected in the 2019 local elections.

== Features ==
Sandy Ridge is noted for its two cemeteries, Sandy Ridge Cemetery and Sandy Ridge Urn Cemetery. Both cemeteries were relocated to Sandy Ridge from various areas in Kowloon and Hong Kong Island in 1949.

The Border District Headquarters of the Hong Kong Police Force are located next to the village of Sha Ling.
