= Lowes =

Lowes or similar words may refer to:

== Businesses ==
- Lowe's, American big box home improvement chain
- Lowe's Canada, former Canadian division of Lowe's
- Lowes Foods, an American grocery store chain
- Lowes Menswear, an Australian menswear chain
- Lowe's Market, a regional supermarket chain with locations in Texas, New Mexico, Colorado, and Arizona

== Other uses ==
- Lowes, Kentucky, United States
- Lowe's syndrome, a rare genetic condition causing various mental and physical disabilities

== People with the surname ==
- Arnold Lowes (1919–1994), English footballer
- Bob Lowes (born 1963), Canadian ice hockey coach
- James Lowes (born 1969), English rugby player
- John Livingston Lowes (1867–1945), American scholar of English literature

== See also ==
- Lowe (disambiguation)
- Loews (disambiguation)
