= Löw =

Löw (or Loew) is a surname of German or Yiddish origin. Another romanization of the Yiddish name לייב is Leib. It may refer to:

== People ==
- Benjamin Wolf Löw (1775–1851), Polish-Hungarian rabbi
- Franklin M. Loew (1939–2003), veterinarian
- Frederick W. Loew (1834–1909), French-American lawyer and judge
- Hermann Loew (1807–1879), German entomologist
- Immanuel Löw (1854–1944), Hungarian rabbi, scholar and politician
- Isaak Löw Hofmann, Edler von Hofmannsthal (1759-1849), Austrian merchant
- Jacques Loew (1908–1999), French priest and labor activist
- Joachim Löw (born 1960), German football player and coach
- Judah Loew ben Bezalel (c. 1520–1609), purported creator of the Golem of Prague
- Maj-Lis Lööw (born 1936), Swedish politician
- Marcus Loew, American businessman and film industry pioneer
- Mattias Löw (born 1970), Swedish film director
- Michael Loew (1907–1985), abstract expressionist artist
- Moritz Löw (1841–1900), Hungarian-German astronomer
- Oscar Loew (1844–1941), German chemist
- Peter Oliver Loew (born 1967), German historian
- Samuel Löw (1720–1806), Czech Talmudist
- Samuel Löw Brill, Hungarian rabbi and Talmud scholar
- Stefan Löw (born 1990), German politician
- Zsolt Lőw (born 1979), Hungarian footballer

== See also ==
- Loews (disambiguation)
- Loewe (disambiguation)
- Löwe (disambiguation)
- Loeb (disambiguation)
