= Stefan Löw =

German politician (born 1990)

Stefan Löw (born 28 August 1990 in Neustadt an der Waldnaab) is a German politician who is a member of the Alternative for Germany party and former German policeman. He has been a member of the Bavarian parliament since 2018.

== Life ==
Löw worked as a Federal police officer in Bavaria. In 2017 at the age of 27, he was declared unfit for service and put on retirement. He gave as reason for this to the local press that he was no longer able to work with refugees as the reason for his incapacity to work resulting from their alleged variety of diseases. He is a member of the Bavarian Alternative for Germany. He ran in the 2018 Bavarian state elections as a precinct representative for the Tirschenreuth district and third on the party list for the AfD in the Upper Palatinate. Löw was elected as a member of the Bavarian Parliament. Löw is currently a member on the committees for local issues, internal security and sport.

== Controversies ==
Löw was involved in triggering a police operation during the 2018 Bavarian state election campaigns when a woman at the AfD information booth allegedly referred to two members as "piglets." Löw subsequently wanted to report the woman and therefore asked for her personal details. When the woman refused to tell him, Löw wanted to temporarily detain her (Citizen's arrest) until the police arrived, after which there was a scuffle with her husband, who called the police. This was followed by several displays on the part of the AfD members. These libel and defamation cases were discontinued a few months later.

After the 2018 state election, several election complaints were received by the Bavarian state parliament over the ballot, which had Löw's job description on it. Although Löw had already been retired early in 2017, he had his profession listed as "police officer" on the ballot. Members of the Legal Affairs Committee were critical of this move but as it was permitted by law, the complaints were dismissed.

In July 2020 Löw caused a scandal in the Bavarian state parliament when he provocatively kept his gas mask on during his speech in a debate. He pointed out the so-called mask requirement. Repeated requests by the State Vice President Alexander Hold to remove the gas mask were made to noavail. Hold then deprived the MP of the right to speak and reprimanded him due to his "unruly conduct with the aim of mocking the Landtag".
