= Low (English band) =

English duo active in the 1980s and 1990s

- Origin: England
- Years active: 1989–1993
- Label: Swanyard Records
- Past members: Grant Boult; Brian Nash

Low were an English duo consisting of the Promise vocalist Grant Boult and former Frankie Goes to Hollywood guitarist Brian Nash. They were active between 1989 and 1993, recording an unreleased album for Swanyard Records, Enter the Bigger Reality, and releasing one single, "Tearing My Soul Apart", in 1992.

== History ==
Frankie Goes to Hollywood guitarist Brian Nash and the Promise vocalist Grant Boult first met during Frankie Goes to Hollywood's final tour in 1987, on which the Promise were a supporting act. With Frankie Goes to Hollywood's split in 1987, singers Holly Johnson and Paul Rutherford pursued solo careers and the remaining three band members, Nash, bassist Mark O'Toole and drummer Peter Gill, decided to continue working together. They resumed as the Shuffle Brothers and recruited Dave Harris, a former vocalist and guitarist for Fashion, as the singer. In 1988, the band recorded some demos with Harris on vocals and these were shopped to various labels in the attempt to find a record deal. The ongoing legal battle between Johnson and Frankie Goes to Hollywood's label, ZTT Records, discouraged some labels from any involvement.

The band gained the interest of London Recordings, but the label was not keen on Harris as the singer, so the band replaced him with Boult, whose band, the Promise, had recently split. London then commissioned further demos and offered the band a deal in 1989 on the condition that they use the Frankie Goes to Hollywood name. The band reluctantly agreed, but the deal fell apart after Johnson refused to give permission for the use of the name, believing that it would "devalue what we'd already achieved". The band amicably agreed to go their separate ways later in 1989, but Nash and Boult decided to continue working together as a duo under the name Honey Ryder. They used Nash's home studio to continue writing and recording demos. Meanwhile, Nash returned to working as an electrician to provide his family with a source of income. In 1991, the duo signed to the independent label Swanyard Records, allowing Nash to return to music full time. They subsequently changed their name to Low as they felt a lot of their material was "a bit moody and laidback".

Swanyard commissioned a full album, Enter the Bigger Reality, on which Low were inspired by many different musical genres. The album was recorded at Swanyard, Strongroom and Trident Studios, with Low and Steve Lovell as the producers and Stuart Bruce as the engineer. The duo hired Andy Coughlan on bass and Tony Kiley on drums for the sessions, and other musicians to provide their contributions included Simon Watson on guitar, Steve Broughton on piano, Guy Chambers on organ and string arrangement for "England in the Rain", Luís Jardim on percussion, and Mick Wilson, Larry Oliver, Miriam Stockley and Stevie Lange on backing vocals. Once recording was completed, Tom Lord-Alge did the mixing for the majority of the tracks, with additional mixes by Simon Vinestock.

The sleeve cover of the "Tearing My Soul Apart" single.

The band's debut single, "Tearing My Soul Apart", was released on 24 August 1992 through Swanyard Discs Ltd on 7-inch, 12-inch and CD formats, with distribution by BMG UK. The song, credited to Boult, Gill, Harris, Nash and O'Toole, was originally written by Nash, O'Toole and Gill when they working together after Frankie Goes to Hollywood's split. It failed to enter the top 75 of the UK Singles Chart and reached its peak of number 118 in its first week in the charts. A music video was filmed at Walton Castle in Clevedon, North Somerset, which at the time was the home of Rai and Margarita Hamilton, who ran and owned 51% of Swanyard. The video was directed by Peter Martin on a budget of £6,000, and one of the extras hired to appear in it was English actress Rachel Weisz. Speaking of the video, Nash told the Western Daily Press in 1992, "It looks great, actually. We shot it at night for maximum effect and it looks like something out of The Man Who Fell to Earth."

The single itself received generally positive reviews. Radio presenter Simon Mayo, writing for the Nottingham Evening Post, described it as a "stunner", and Graeme Anderson of the Sunderland Echo praised it as an "impressive debut featuring [a] big dance floor sound from a group that's risen from Frankie Goes to Hollywood's ashes". Penny Kiley of the Liverpool Echo commented that it is "a slab of noisy, '70s-influenced rhythmic rock with hints of everything – from David Bowie to The Who", whereas the Evening Chronicle described it as a "slow, sinuously seductive ballad". Push of Melody Maker was more critical, calling it "knock-kneed AOR slop" and concluded, "Brian [Nash] will never see his name in print again."

The album, Enter the Bigger Reality, was due to follow the single in September 1992, but it was left unreleased as Swanyard suffered financial problems, except for a small circulation of advance promotional copies, dated 18 August 1992, issued on cassette. When Swanyard went into receivership, the masters for the album and various unreleased demos were returned to Low.

Nash and Boult subsequently decided to drop the Low name and form a new band, Dr Jolly's Salvation Circus. Initially a four-piece, with Mick Anker on bass and Tony Kiley on drums, they recorded some demos with Adrian Bushby as the engineer. They later added Mitt Gamon on second guitar and harmonica, and Kiley was replaced by Paul Pridmore. Nash and Boult wrote fresh material for the band and further demos were recorded either with Busby or engineer Martin Russell at his own studio. They were shopped to various labels, but received little interest and the band folded. By 1995, Nash and Boult went their separate ways after Nash decided to embark on a solo career.

== Discography ==
=== Albums ===
- Enter the Bigger Reality (1992, unreleased)

=== Singles ===
- "Tearing My Soul Apart" (1992)
