= Luohu Port =

- 罗湖口岸
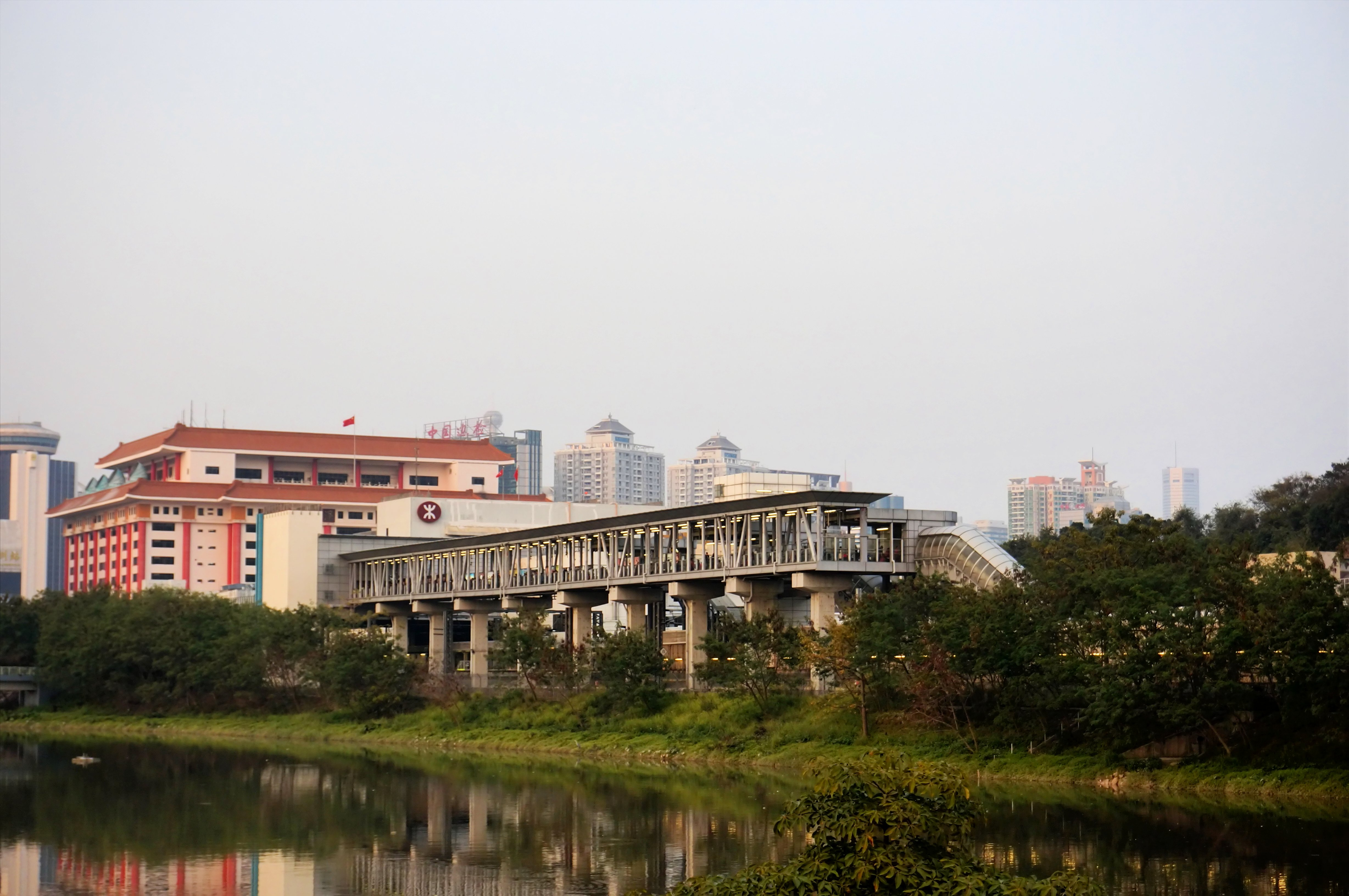
- Lo Wu station and Checkpoint seen against China's Luohu Port in Shenzhen

General information
- Type: Border control
- Location: Luohu District, Shenzhen, China
- Coordinates: 22°31′56″N 114°06′48″E
- Operator: National Immigration Administration (mainland China)

Website
- ka.sz.gov.cn
- Coordinates: 22°31′56″N 114°06′48″E
- Carries: Pedestrians
- Crosses: Frontier Closed Area

Statistics
- Toll: No toll

Location
- Interactive map of Luohu Port

Luohu Port
- Traditional Chinese: 羅湖口岸
- Simplified Chinese: 罗湖口岸
Transcriptions
Standard Mandarin
- Hanyu Pinyin: Luóhú Kǒu'àn
Yue: Cantonese
- Jyutping: lo4 wu4 hau2 ngon6

The Luohu Port (Chinese: 罗湖口岸; pinyin: Luóhú Kǒu'àn) is a port of entry/border crossing between mainland China and Hong Kong, located in Luohu District of Shenzhen and Lo Wu, New Territories of Hong Kong. It sits within the Frontier Closed Area. The control point is integrated with Lo Wu station of the Mass Transit Railway (MTR) and Luohu station of the Shenzhen metro, the Hong Kong counterpart being Lo Wu Control Point.

Statistics show that the port is the third busiest in the world. The port of entry is operated by the Bureau of Exit and Entry Administration of the Ministry of Public Security, and the General Administration of Customs. In 2015, 83.2 million people passed through Lo Wu Control Point, making it the busiest control point in Hong Kong.

It is served by Shenzhen railway station of the Guangshen Railway (formerly the Canton-Kowloon Railway Chinese Section), and Luohu station of the Shenzhen Metro, whereas its counterpart in Hong Kong is interconnected with Lo Wu station on the East Rail line, formerly the Kowloon-Canton Railway British Section.

== Operating hours ==
6:30 a.m. to midnight every day.

== Public transit access ==
=== Train ===
Guangzhou–Shenzhen railway: Shenzhen railway station

=== Metro ===
- Shenzhen Metro Line 1: Luohu station Exit A2
- Shenzhen Metro Line 9: Renmin South station Exit A1, B
- Hong Kong MTR East Rail line : Lo Wu Station

== Gallery ==
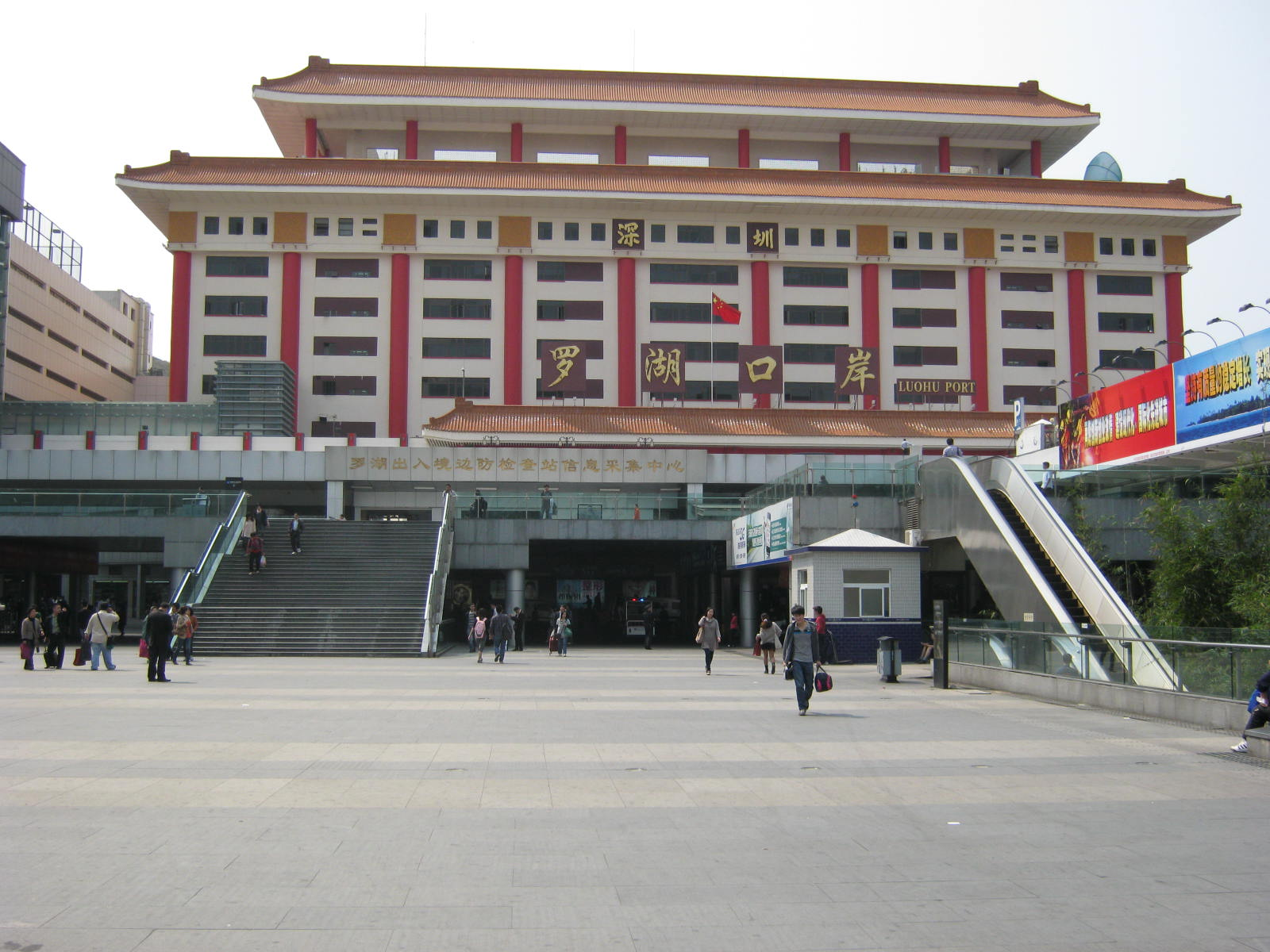
Luohu Port

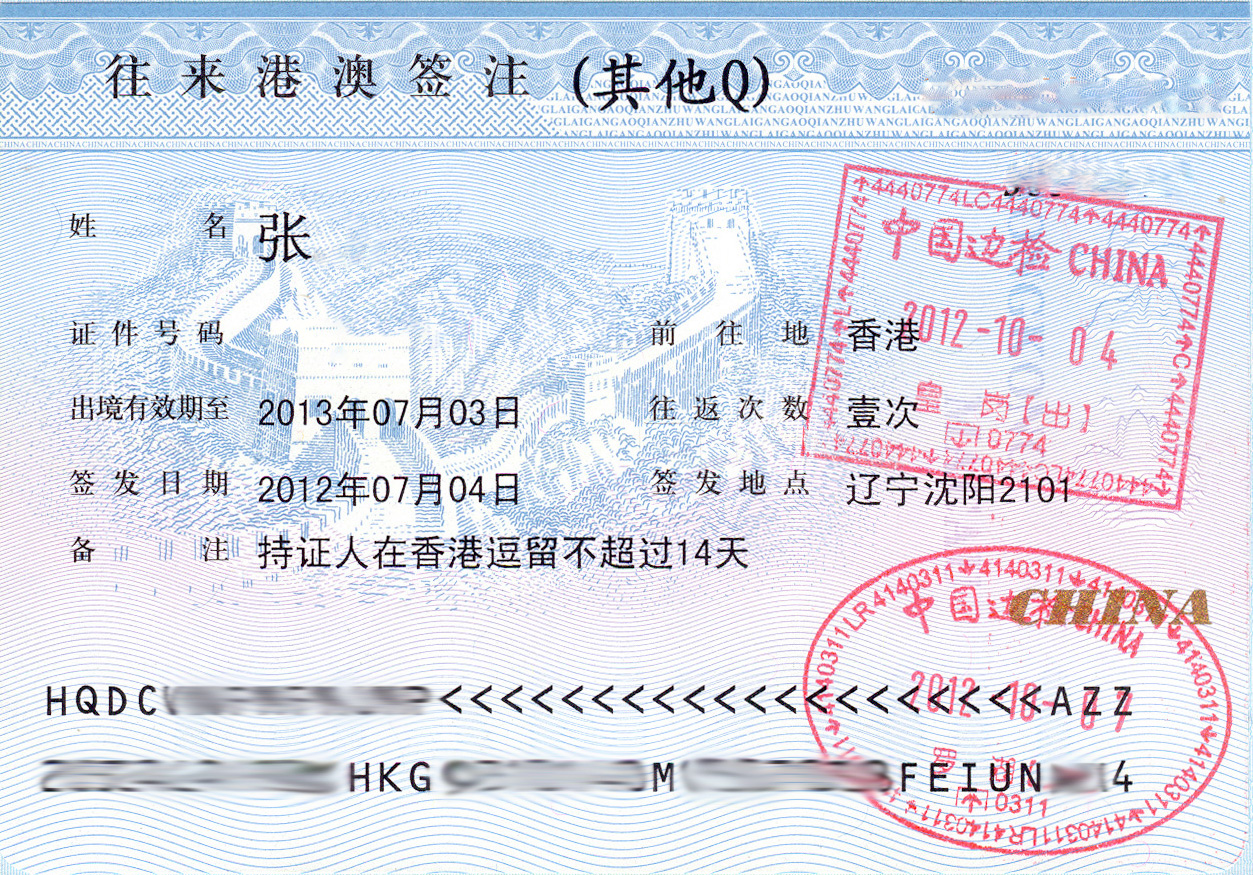
Hong Kong Visit Permit issued by People's Republic of China with a Luohu Port Entry Stamp.

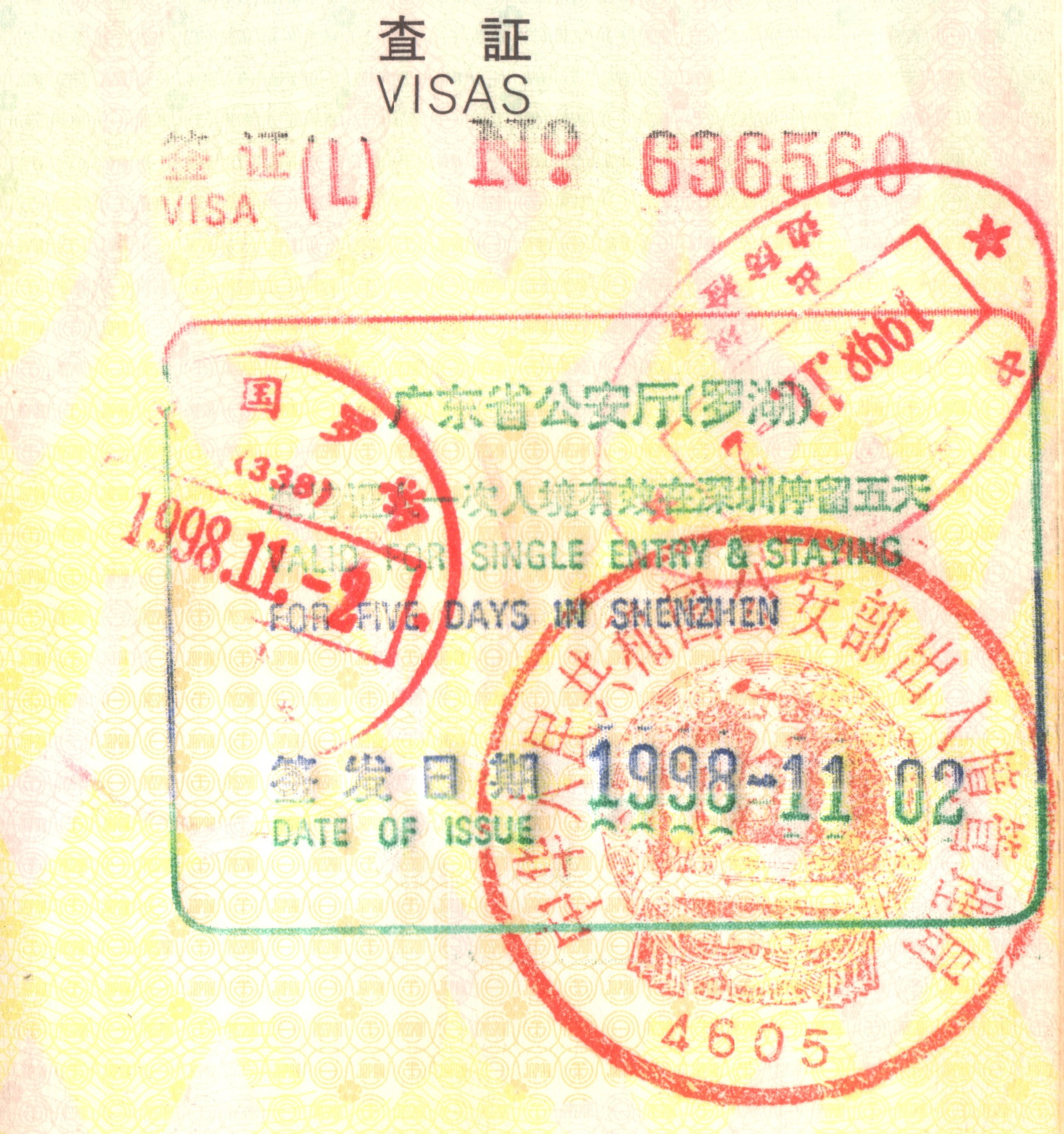
Single entry permit into Shenzhen, China, issued at the Luohu Port on the Hong Kong-Shenzhen border, with the older style entry and exit stamps.
