= Jacob Ezekiel Löwy =

Silesian rabbi and author

Personal life
- Born: August 24, 1814 Hotzenplotz, Silesia, Austrian Empire
- Died: November 20, 1864 (aged 50) Beuthen, Silesia, Austrian Empire

Religious life
- Religion: Judaism

Jacob Ezekiel Löwy (Hebrew: יעקב יחזקאל הלוי, German: Jacob Ezechiel Löwy; August 24, 1814 – November 20, 1864) was a Silesian rabbi and author.

== Biography ==
Löwy was born in Hotzenplotz, Austrian Silesia. At a young age he went to Lepinik to study under Baruch Fränkel-Teomim, afterwards attending various yeshivot in his native country. He then became a pupil of Wolf Löw in Nagytapolcsány, and, inclining to Ḥasidism, he went successively to Lemberg and Brody in order to continue his rabbinical education. Finally he went to Berlin, where he acquired some secular learning. Having obtained after great difficulties a license to marry, he settled as a business man in Bielitz, and in 1846 was appointed district rabbi of Wadowice, with a seat at Oświęcim (Auschwitz). In 1854 he was elected rabbi of Beuthen, which position he continued to hold until his death.

Löwy was the author of Biḳḳoret ha-Talmud: Kritisch-Talmudisches Lexikon, containing 150 articles for a proposed Talmudic encyclopedia. He also published studies in Ha-Maggid, Ha-Melitz, and other journals.

== Selected publications ==
- Tisporet Lulyanit. 1839.
- Biḳḳoret ha-Talmud: Kritisch-talmudisches Lexikon. Vol. 1. Vienna. 1863.
