= Löwe Automobil =

German automotive parts manufacturer

- Company type: Privately Held
- Industry: Automotive
- Founded: Berlin
- Headquarters: Berlin
- Area served: Worldwide
- Website: loeweautomobil.de

Löwe Automobil is a German automotive part manufacturer that specializes in various car sensors. It is a brand of LASPA Berlin.

== Products ==
Löwe Automobil products include mass flow sensors, fuel pressure regulators, oxygen sensors, universal oxygen sensors, idle speed controllers, and throttle position sensors.

BMW and Mercedes-Benz are the main focus of Löwe Automobil's airflow meter production.

Löwe Automobil mass airflow meters are sold all over the world.

== Spelling ==
Because of the German letter "ö" in the word Löwe (German for lion), the company's name is a matter of some confusion — where both Lowe Automobil and Loewe Automobile are acceptable variations of the Anglicized spelling.
