= Löwe =

Löwe or Loewe may refer to:

== Business ==
- Loewe (electronics), a German television sets and other electronics maker
- Loewe (fashion brand), a Spanish luxury clothing and accessories brand
- Löwe Automobil, a German automotive parts manufacturer

== Military ==
- Panzer VII Löwe, a WW2 German tank project
- HNoMS Gyller (1938), a Norwegian warship captured by Nazi Germany and renamed Löwe

== People ==
- Loewe (surname)

== Other uses ==
- Loewe Prize, various arts prizes awarded by the Loewe Foundation, of the Spanish fashion brand
- Der Löwe (1944–1973), a racehorse and stud stallion
- Nordische Löwe, a ship owned by the Danish East India Company
- Löwe (sculpture), a sculpture by August Gaul

== See also ==
- Löw
- Lowe (disambiguation)
- Loewi
- Loewy
- Lion (disambiguation)
