= Liu Pok =

Village in Sheung Shui, Hong Kong

Coordinates: 22.527580°N 114.105039°E

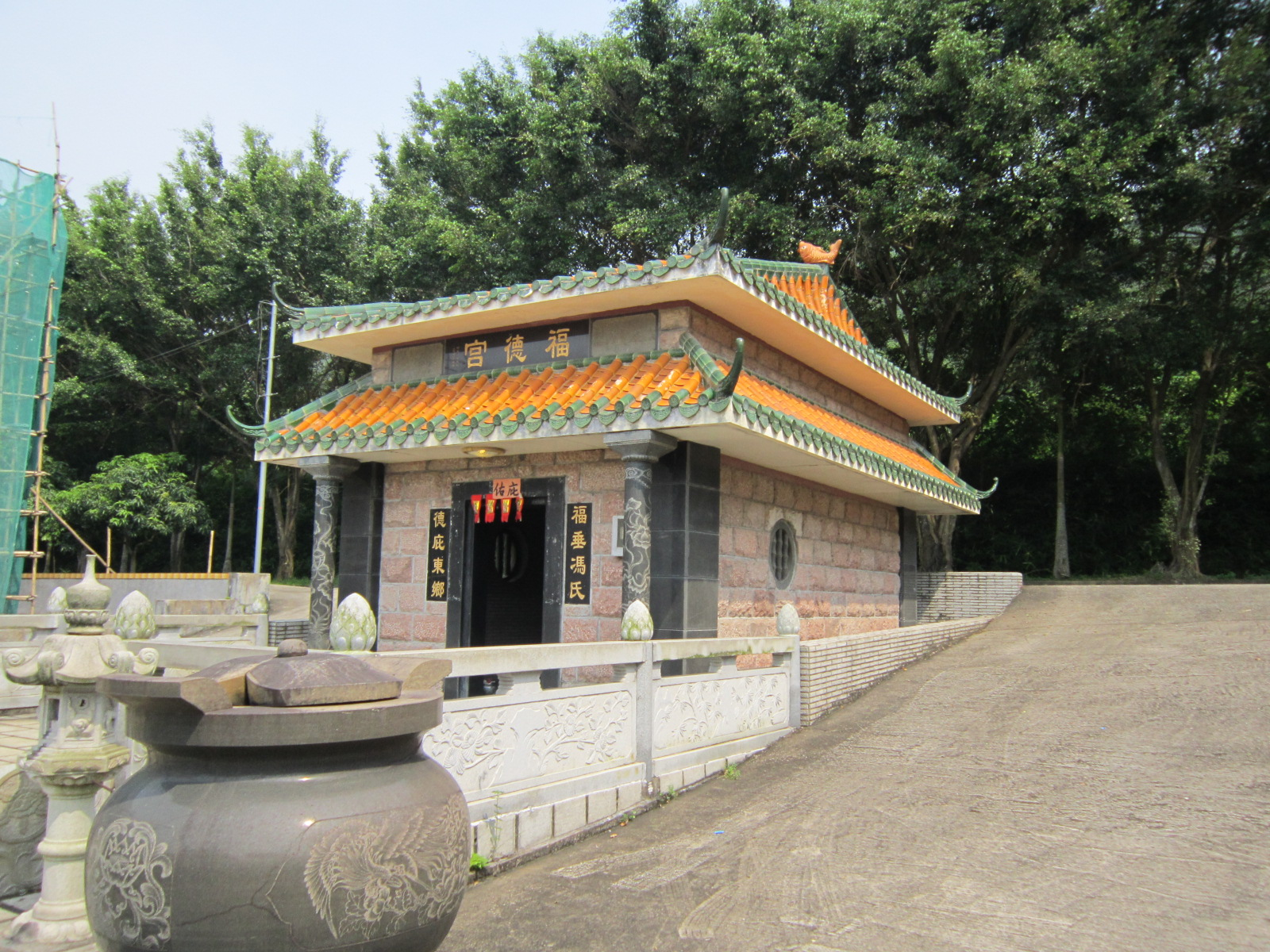
Fook Tak Kung Temple in Liu Pok.

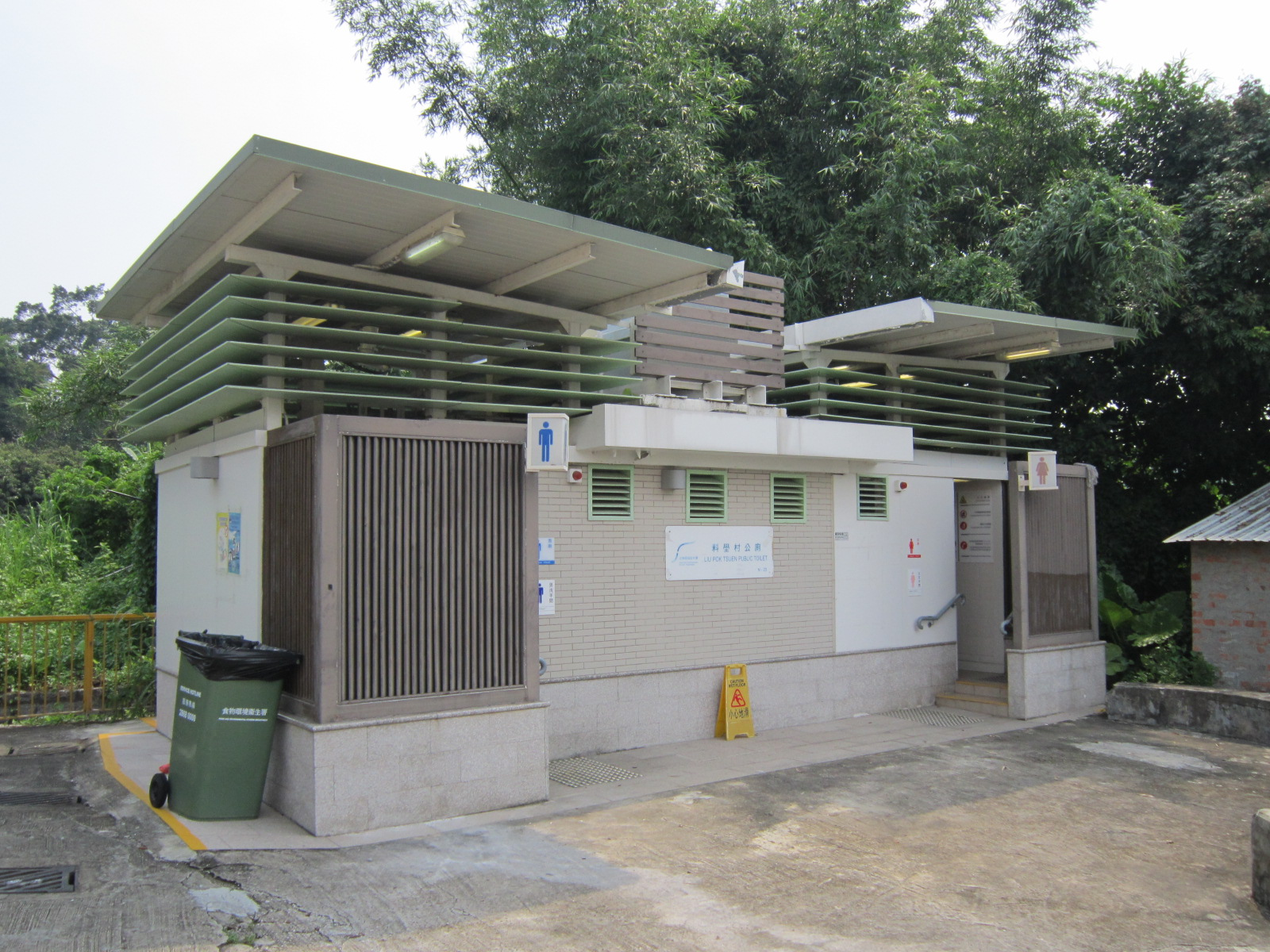
Public toilet in Liu Pok.

Liu Pok (Chinese: 料壆) is a village in Sheung Shui, North District, Hong Kong.

== Administration ==
Liu Pok is a recognized village under the New Territories Small House Policy. It is one of the villages represented within the Sheung Shui District Rural Committee. For electoral purposes, Liu Pok is part of the Sheung Shui Rural constituency, which is currently represented by Simon Hau Fuk-tat.

== History ==
At the time of the 1911 census, the population of Liu Pok was 237. The number of males was 136.
