= Man Kam To =

Coordinates: 22.5348°N 114.1275°E

- Traditional Chinese: 文錦渡
- Simplified Chinese: 文锦渡
Transcriptions
Standard Mandarin
- Hanyu Pinyin: Wénjǐndù
- Wade–Giles: Wên^{2}-chin^{3}-tu^{4}
- IPA: [wə̌n.tɕìn.tû]
Hakka
- Romanization: Vun^{2} Gim^{3} Tu^{4}
Yue: Cantonese
- Yale Romanization: Màhngámdouh
- Jyutping: man4 gam2 dou6
- IPA: [mɐn˩.kɐm˧˥.tɔw˨]

Man Kam To or Mankamto (traditional Chinese: 文錦渡) is an area in the North District, New Territories, Hong Kong near the border with Shenzhen in mainland China.

== Administration ==
For electoral purposes, Man Kam To is part of the Sha Ta constituency of the North District Council. It is currently represented by Ko Wai-kei, who was elected in the local elections.

== Border ==
The area includes the Man Kam To Control Point, one of the four road checkpoints between Hong Kong and mainland China, as well as the San Uk Ling Holding Centre (新屋嶺拘留中心), operated by the Immigration Department.

== Closed Area ==
Access to Man Kam To was previously restricted as it is located in the Frontier Closed Area of the New Territories. For those who are not residents within the Closed Area, or are not crossing the border, a Closed Area Permit was required.

As from 4 January 2016, most of Man Kam To was removed from the Frontier Closed Area and now only the border facilities are in the area.

== See also ==
- Sandy Ridge Cemetery
