= Lo Wu Control Point =

Hong Kong border checkpoint

- 羅湖管制站
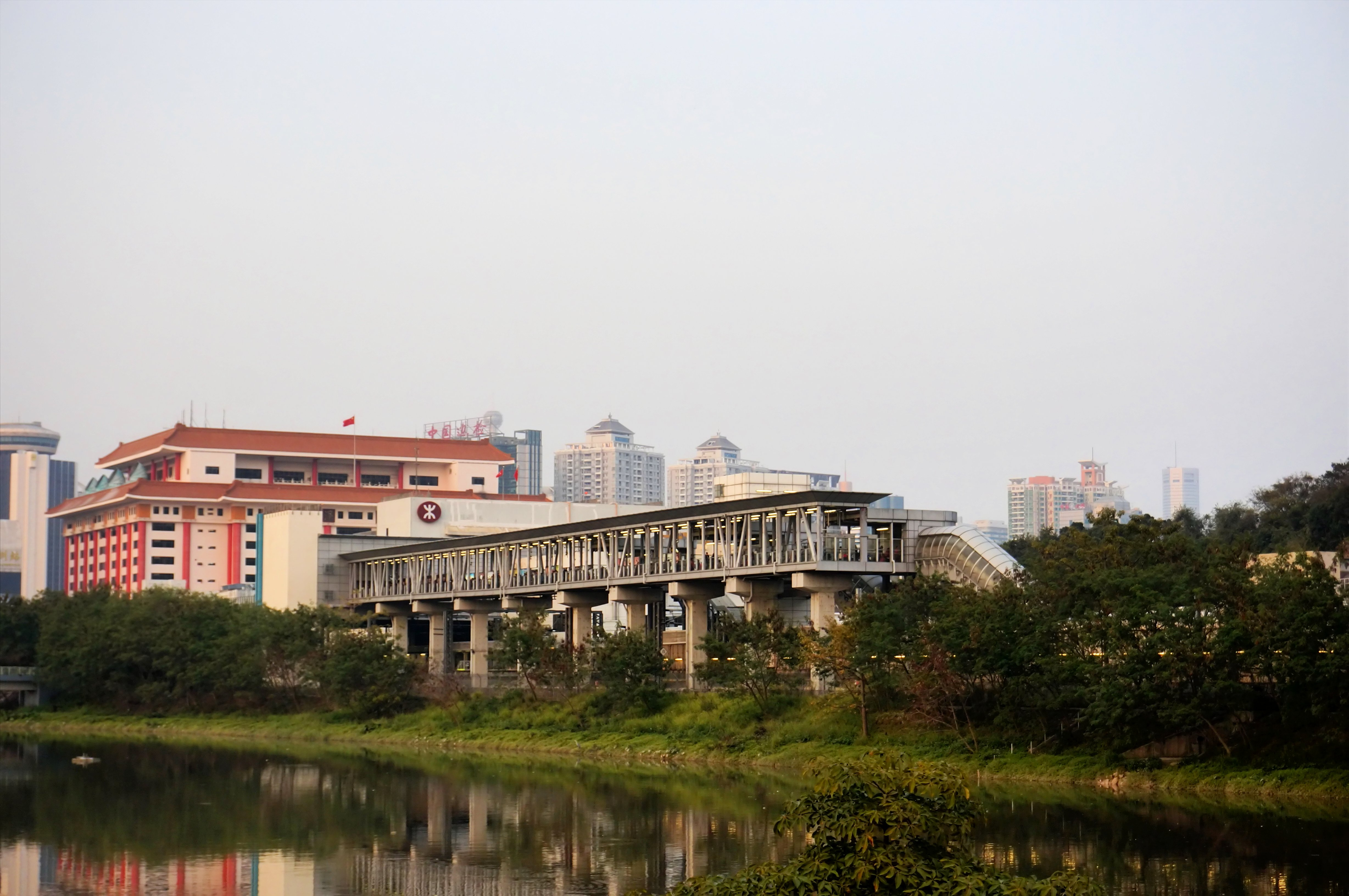
- Lo Wu station and Checkpoint seen against China's Luohu Port in Shenzhen
- Interactive map of the Lo Wu Control Point area

General information
- Type: Border control
- Location: Lo Wu, Hong Kong
- Coordinates: 22°31′56″N 114°06′48″E
- Management: Immigration Department (Hong Kong), Customs and Excise Department (Hong Kong)

Website
- td.gov.hk
- Coordinates: 22°31′44″N 114°07′06″E
- Carries: Pedestrians
- Crosses: Frontier Closed Area

Statistics
- Toll: No toll

Location
- Interactive map of Lo Wu Control Point

Lo Wu Control Point
- Traditional Chinese: 羅湖管制站
- Simplified Chinese: 罗湖管制站
- Jyutping: lo4 wu4 gun2 zai3 zaam6
Transcriptions
Standard Mandarin
- Hanyu Pinyin: Luóhú Guǎnzhì zhàn
Yue: Cantonese
- Jyutping: lo4 wu4 gun2 zai3 zaam6

Lo Wu Control Point (Chinese: 羅湖管制站) is a Hong Kong immigration control point in Lo Wu, New Territories. It sits within the Frontier Closed Area that runs along the border with mainland China. Its counterpart across the border is the Luohu Port in Shenzhen, China.

The control point is integrated with Lo Wu station of the Mass Transit Railway (MTR).

In 2015, 83.2 million people passed through Lo Wu Control Point, making it the busiest control point in Hong Kong. It is open from 06:30 to 00:00 midnight daily.
