= Lo Wu =

Area of Hong Kong

Coordinates: 22.5275°N 114.1145°E

- Traditional Chinese: 羅湖
- Simplified Chinese: 罗湖
- Literal meaning: Shell Lake
Transcriptions
Standard Mandarin
- Hanyu Pinyin: Luóhú
Hakka
- Romanization: lo2 fu2
Yue: Cantonese
- Jyutping: lo4 wu4
- IPA: [lɔ̏ː wȕː]

Lo Wu (Chinese: 羅湖) is an area in North District, New Territories, Hong Kong. It lies on the border between Hong Kong and mainland China, specifically the Luohu District of Shenzhen in mainland China. The area is most notable as the location of the most heavily used immigration control point for passengers travelling to and from mainland China. It is where the Lo Wu station is located.

== History ==
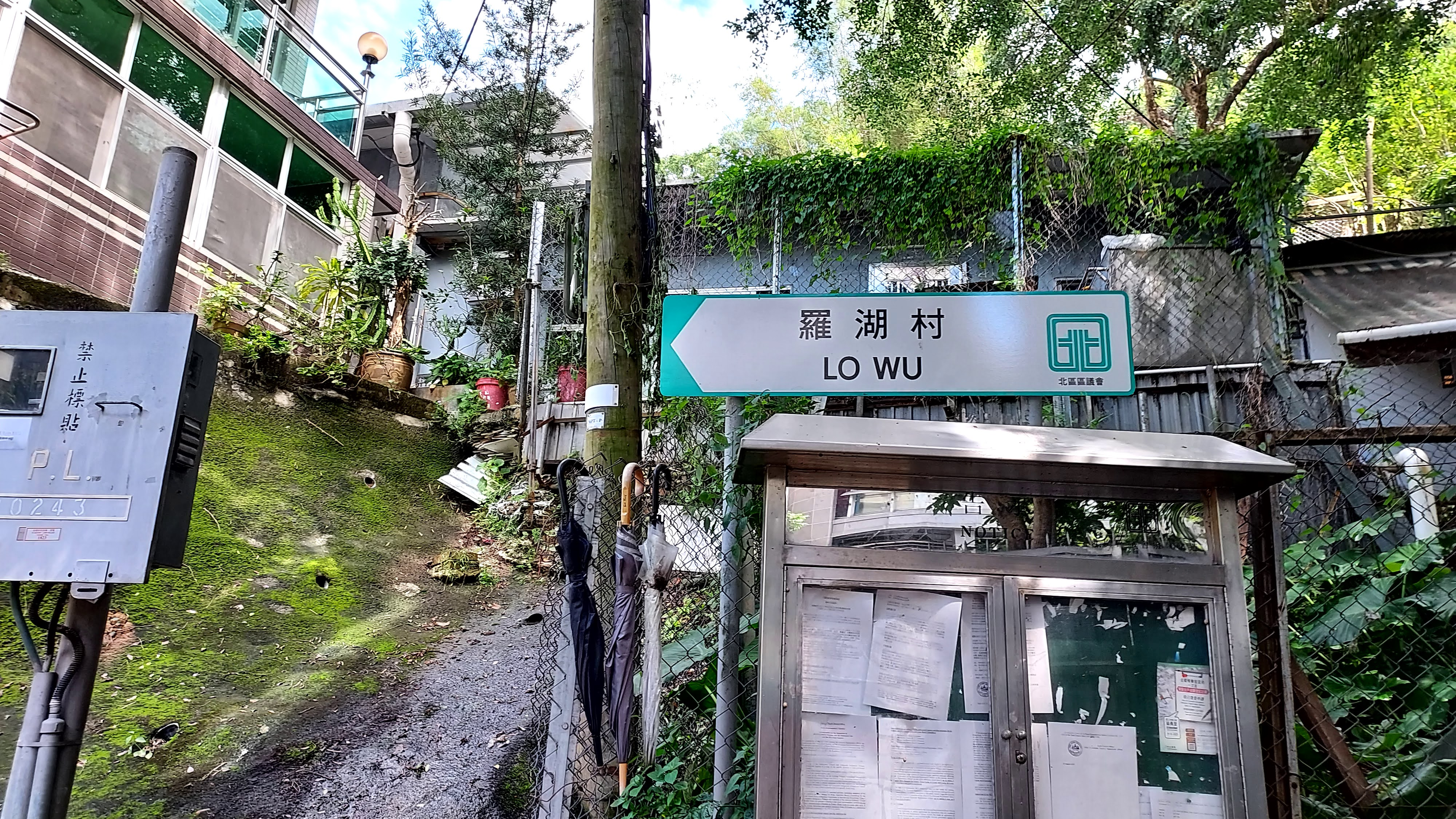
Lo Wu Village

Lo Wu (羅湖) was known as 螺湖 (Lo Wu, lit. shell lake) in Cantonese. 羅 (lo) and 螺 (lo) are two characters with same consonant and vowel but of different tones.

Lo Wu was mentioned in the list of withdrawn villages during Qing era against remaining resistance of former Ming.

At the time of the 1911 census, the population of Lo Wu was 8.

== Location ==
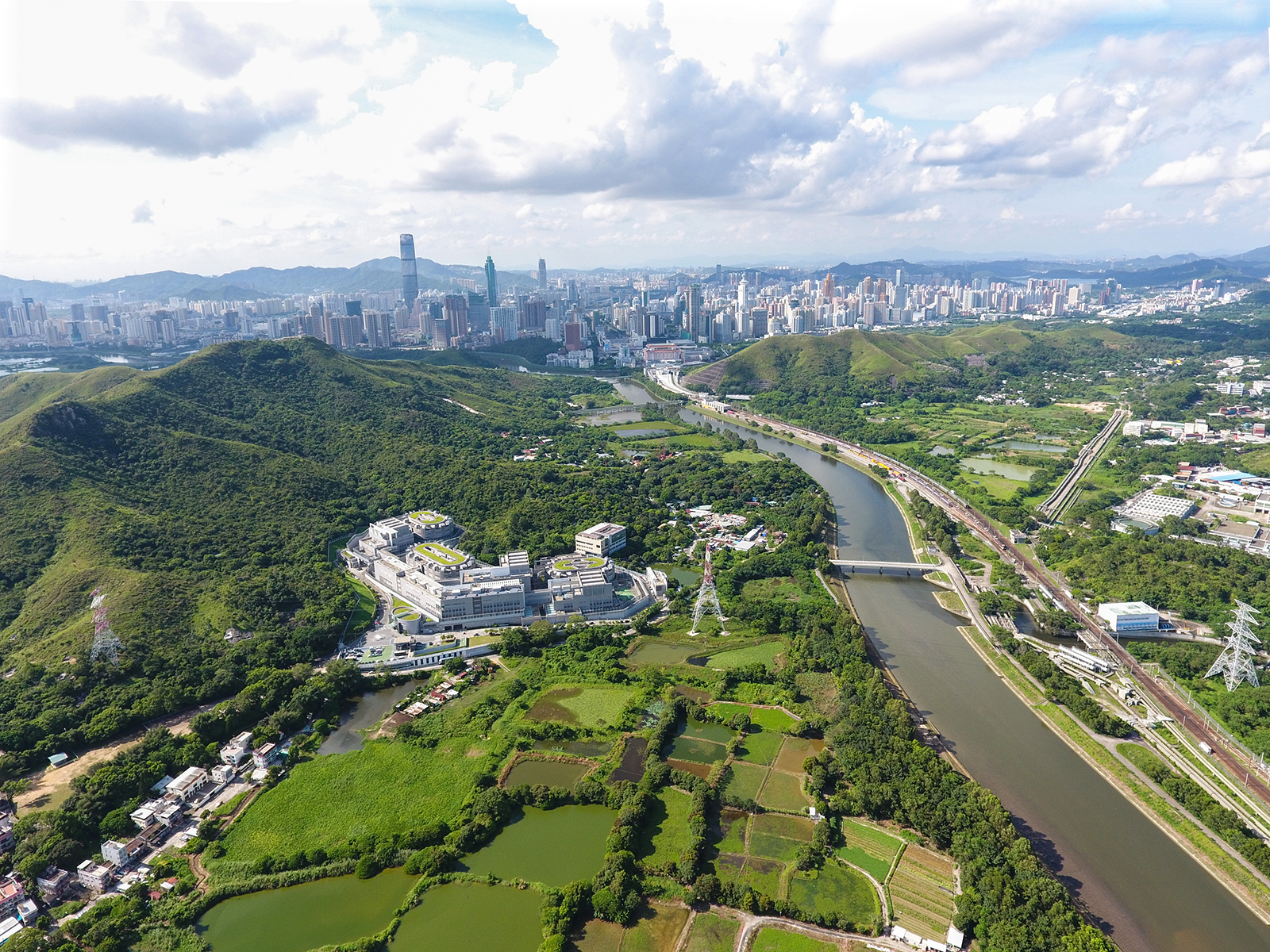
Lo Wu

Lo Wu is located at junction of Sheung Yue River and Sham Chun River. East of Lo Wu is a hill named Sandy Ridge, known as Sha Ling to locals, which is one of the major cemeteries located in Hong Kong. The entire Lo Wu area was divided in 1898 by the Convention for the Extension of Hong Kong Territory.

For many years, a British Army camp had lain at the base of Crest Hill, so called because a regimental badge had been carved into its slopes. Latterly, Royal Artillery survey units occupied the largely tented camp below the hill, with duties including observation into the People's Republic from the outlook post on topping Crest Hill. In February 1950, during a period of assaults on the mainland from Formosa, an aircraft of the Koumingtang flew illegally over Hong Kong to bomb the railway to Guangzhou beyond Lo Wu.

Between 1898 and 1949, there was no border patrol in the area, and as a result, people were free to travel between Hong Kong and China. In 1952, in an effort to combat illegal immigration and smuggling, the Hong Kong Government established the Frontier Closed Area, which included the Lo Wu area.

The border crossing facility is only accessible by the Lo Wu station of the East Rail line. For those who are not residents within the Frontier Closed Area, and are not crossing the border, a Closed Area Permit is required. Applications for Closed Area Permits outside the Closed Area can be made at the Sheung Shui Police station in Fanling.

== MTR East Rail line Lo Wu station ==
Lo Wu station is the northern terminus of the East Rail line of Hong Kong, sitting in the southern bank of the Sham Chun River, the Frontier Closed Area on Hong Kong's northern frontier. The station serves as a primary checkpoint for rail passengers between Hong Kong and mainland China.

== Land boundary control point ==
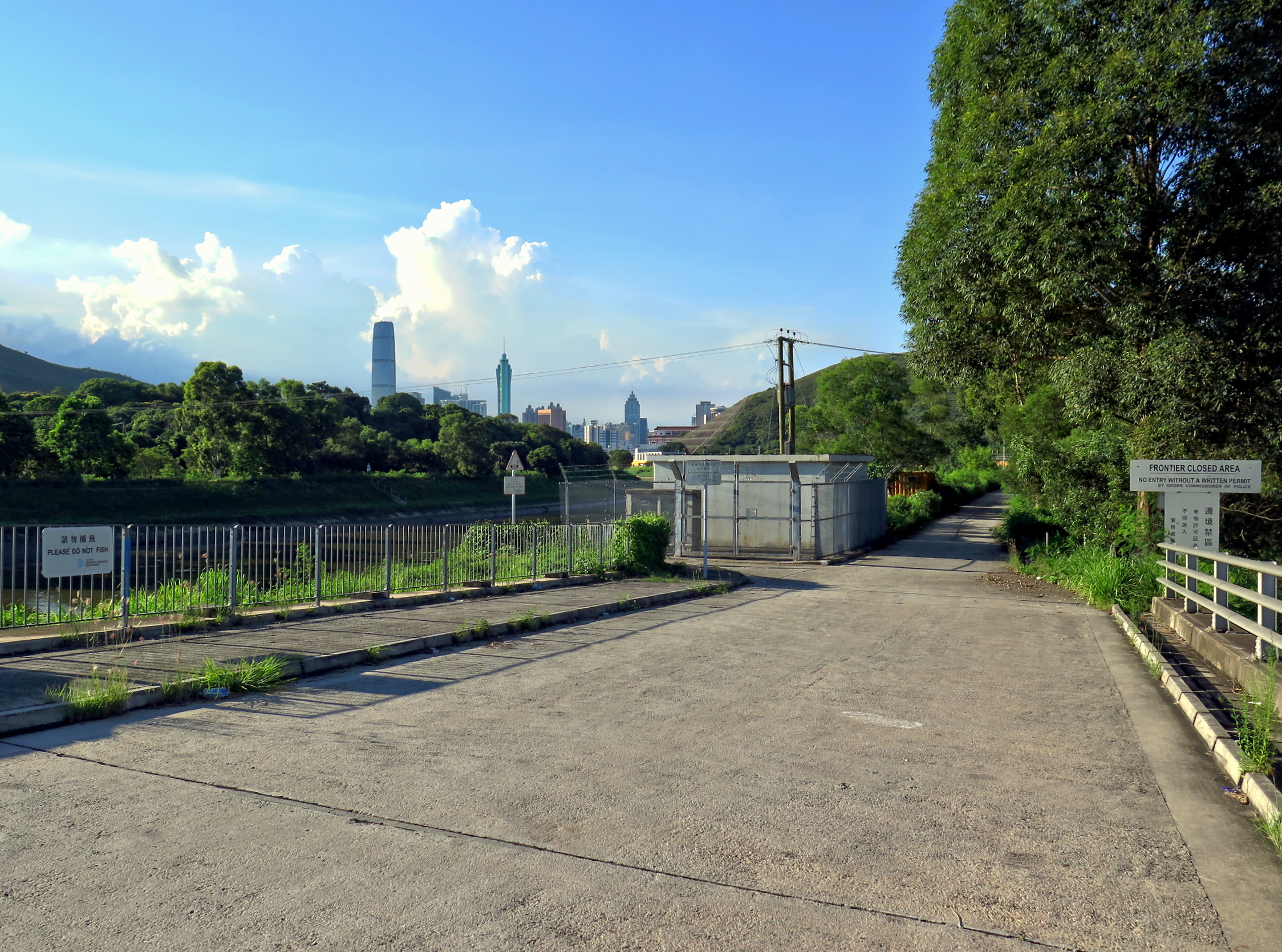
Lo Wu Frontier Area Sign

Lo Wu Immigration Control Point (羅湖入境管制站) is a passenger cross border point between Hong Kong and mainland China. It operates daily from 6:30 am to midnight. During peak hours, holidays and weekends, the waiting time for entries and exits through Lo Wu is shorter than the other 3 control points because it has the largest visitors' handling capacity. Of all passenger departures (including non-residents) from Hong Kong for mainland China, 90% go through the land border control points of Lo Wu, Lok Ma Chau, Man Kam To and Sha Tau Kok, with Lo Wu accounting for 85% of total departures.

Lo Wu is the most popular border crossing for people travelling to mainland China because most people take the East Rail line, which is more convenient compared to other means of transport. By passing through Lo Wu, one can reach the busiest commercial zone of Shenzhen in the shortest period of time.

Starting from 5 July 2002, a returning Hong Kong resident aged 18 or above who has spent at least 24 hours outside Hong Kong may bring in 60 cigarettes duty-free for his own use. Starting from 1 August 2010, however, this duty-free allowance has been reduced to 19. Under the Dutiable Commodities Ordinance, an incoming passenger must declare dutiable cigarettes to a Customs officer and pay the duty on them.

=== 24-hour border crossing through Lo Wu ===
In mid-December 2002, the Hong Kong government announced that the Lok Ma Chau immigration control point bordering the Huanggang Port Control Point on the Shenzhen side shall take the lead to provide round-the-clock passenger service just before Chinese New Year. Vehicles and container trucks have already been moving both ways throughout the night at this control point.

However, 24-hour border-crossing at Lo Wu control point is still undergoing vigorous debates mainly arguing about the limited number of passengers at night. In addition, higher costs and noise pollution are likely to be created. Kowloon-Canton Railway chairman Michael Tien has once said that it is absolutely impossible to run railway services round-the-clock because of the difficulties in maintenance. This new policy has both advantages and disadvantages. It is clear that trade and transportation and logistic links between mainland China and Hong Kong will flourish. However, it may also cause some social problems since it eases the way to go from Hong Kong to mainland China.

=== Safety problems at the land boundary control point ===
Lo Wu is within the Closed Area along the long border. Usually, only travellers wanting to pass through Lo Wu to reach Shenzhen are allowed to enter the area. Citizens wishing to enter the area for other purposes require special approval from the Hong Kong Police Force.

An incident happened in 2000, involving a boy named Yu Man-Hon (Chinese name: 庾文翰), who was mentally disabled. He was missing at the Lo Wu boundary control point. The controversy arose when the fifteen-year-old ran across the boundary control point, without any identification. In the confusion, and due to the lack of understanding by border officers on both sides, he was mistakenly released into mainland China and has not been heard from since. The officials were criticised for a lack of awareness and for failure to recognise Yu's mental disability, letting him free to roam in an unfamiliar place. His parents are still searching for him; as the chances of finding him are diminishing, chances of finding him are unlikely.

== Developments in Lo Wu ==
Due to its strategic location as a gateway to Hong Kong and in the CBD of Shenzhen, the Luohu District has flourished with many top-grade office buildings. Nevertheless, the Lo Wu area in Hong Kong is remote from the city centre, and far from urban development. As it is lying within the Closed Area, access is restricted, development is impossible and the area has largely remained rural. Relatively cheaper prices of durable goods, gourmet dining and entertainment in the Shenzhen side has hit the retail industry of Hong Kong, particularly in Sheung Shui and Fanling in the North District. There is change afoot. Despite the pleas of environmental groups the closed area is to be opened to 'selective' development, despite its splendid isolation for the past 50 years, threatening an unduplicated abundance of local fauna and flora.

== Improvement Projects in Lo Wu ==
=== Sham Chun River ===
In May 1995, the governments of Hong Kong and Shenzhen jointly completed the environmental impact assessment study of the Sham Chun River Stage 1 works (深圳河第一期改善工程), which comprised the construction of two new, wider and deeper river sections of about 3.2 km long at Lok Ma Chau and Liu Pok (料壆) to replace existing river bends. The governments of Hong Kong and Shenzhen were committed to implementing a comprehensive environmental monitoring and audit programme.

== Correctional institution ==
Established in 1997 on the site of what in the previous decade had been a detention camp, which in its turn occupied what had since the British reoccupation of Hong Kong in 1945 been the site of a largely tented British Army camp. The camp was occupied in 1950 by the 15 Observation and 173 Locating Batteries of the Royal Artillery, housed largely in tented accommodation. The 15 Observation Battery was subsequently retitled as the 15 Locating Battery, moving to Korea with the UN forces early in 1951.

After a period of service as a detention camp for Boat People escaped from Vietnam, permanent buildings were constructed for the current minimum security institution for male adult prisoners only. With a capacity for 182 prisoners, it is situated at 163 Ho Sheung Heung Road. In response to the growing importance of the reformation of offenders, the Correctional Services Department (CSD) has set up a new division to focus on rehabilitation services for inmates since January 1998.

The new Rehabilitation Division is headed by Assistant Commissioner (Rehabilitation) and comprises about 380 staff in five units. With the establishment of the Rehabilitation Division, they strive to formulate strategies for the long-term development of rehabilitation services for inmates, to strengthen the co-ordination / connection with the relevant statutory prison sentence review boards, and other concerned bodies on rehabilitation matters of inmates, and to identify the gaps and overlaps in existing rehabilitation services for inmates.

== Lo Wu Saddle Club ==
The Lo Wu Saddle Club, a horse riding establishment that is open to members as well as the general public, is situated at Ho Sheung Heung (河上鄉).

The Club was formerly a camp for the British Army. There have been equines of one sort or another at Lo Wu Camp for over 30 years. The Camp was built to house over 10 British Army Mules, which were used as pack animals for forays into the hills and along the border, as well as for drills and formal parades. Originally known as the RASC the name was changed to the 81st Pack Troop of the Royal Corps of Transport.

Later, horses joined the mules and the Hong Kong Services Saddle Club (HKSSC) came into being, under the command of the Royal Army Vet Corps. The HKSSC was the first and for some time the only place in Hong Kong where riding instruction was given. All other riding establishments were strictly for leisure only. The Army was also the first to hold competitions on the fields here and at the Shek Kong Airfield.

In 1994 with the beginning of withdrawal of British troops from Hong Kong, HKSSC was on the verge of closure. In June of that year a group of keen horse lovers, determined to maintain a base for their riding activities, negotiated a lease on the Lo Wu Camp and took over the administration of what is now known as "Lo Wu Saddle Club".

Themes and objectives of the Club are, among others, promotion of equestrian sport and the care of horses. These are achieved through avenues such as giving of riding instruction to all levels of riders, holding of horse shows and clinics, involvement in the Hong Kong Equestrian Federation and the Pony Club, provision of community services and establishing ties with other places (e.g. Beijing, France, Ireland and New Zealand) and with international trainers.

Today, having seen the very beginning of equestrian in Hong Kong, the Club continues to encourage appreciation of the sport.

== Education ==
There is a primary school called the Lo Wu Public School (羅湖公立學校). It was established by the local inhabitants of the village in Lo Wu Village.

== See also ==
- A collection of seven short stories entitled The Train to Lo Wu, written by Jess Rowe and published in 2005
- Tak Yuet Lau, a village in the area
