= Lowe (surname) =

Lowe is a surname of Old English origin meaning "hill". It may refer to:

== People ==
=== A ===
- Aaron Lowe (born 1974), Canadian ice dancer
- Adolph Lowe (1893–1995), German sociologist and economist
- Al Lowe (born 1946), American computer game programmer
- Alan Lowe (born 1961), Canadian politician
- Alex Lowe (actor) (born 1968), English actor
- Alex Lowe (mountaineer) (1958–1999), American mountaineer
- Alex Lowe, singer/guitarist with Hurricane No. 1
- Alf Lowe (born 1931), British sailor
- Alice Lowe (born 1977), English actress
- Andrea Lowe (born 1975), English actress
- Ann Lowe (1898–1981), American fashion designer
- Annie Lowe (1834–1910), Australian suffragist
- Arthur Lowe (1915–1982), English actor
- Arvie Lowe Jr. (born 1978), American actor

=== B ===
- Ben Lowe (born 1985), Australian rugby player
- Bernie Lowe (1917–1993), American music producer
- Bert Lowe (1912–1933), New Zealand boxer
- Bobby Lowe (1865–1951), American baseball player
- Brandon Lowe (born 1994), American baseball player
- Brian Lowe (1939–2024), Australian rules footballer
- Bull Lowe (1895–1939), American football player

=== C ===
- Caitlin Lowe (born 1985), American softball player
- Cass Lowe, British musician
- Catherine Lowe (born 1986), American graphic designer and reality television star
- Chad Lowe (born 1968), American actor
- Charles Lowe (disambiguation)
- Charlie Lowe, American baseball player in 1872
- Chris Lowe (disambiguation)
- Christopher Lowe, who died in 2018 in police custody in Fort Worth, Texas
- Craig Lowe (1957–2023), American mayor of Gainesville, FL
- Crystal Lowe (born 1981), Canadian actress born Yan-Kay Lo
- Cyril Lowe (1891–1983), British rugby player and flying ace

=== D ===
- Daisy Lowe (born 1989), English fashion model
- Daniel Lowe (born 1992), American sports shooter
- Darren Lowe (ice hockey) (born 1960), Canadian ice hockey player
- Darren Lowe (lacrosse), American lacrosse player
- David Lowe (disambiguation)
- Derek Lowe (born 1973), American baseball player
- Derek Lowe (chemist), American chemist, blogger and columnist
- Doug Lowe (Australian politician) (born 1942), Australian politician
- Douglas Lowe (athlete) (1902–1981), British sprinter
- Douglas Lowe (RAF officer) (1922–2018), World War II pilot and Royal Air Force commander

=== E ===
- Earl Lowe (born c. 1950), better known as Little Roy, Jamaican musician
- Ed Lowe (businessman) (1920–1995), American inventor
- Ed Lowe (cyclist) (born 2003), English cyclist
- Ed Lowe (journalist) (1946–2011), American journalist
- Eddie Lowe (footballer) (1925–2009), English footballer
- Eddie Lowe (Canadian football) (born 1960), American politician and football player
- Edmund Lowe (1890–1971), American actor
- Edward Low (disambiguation)
- Edward Joseph Lowe (1825–1900), British botanist, meteorologist and astronomer
- E. J. Lowe (philosopher) (1950–2014), English philosopher
- Emily Lowe (?–1882), British travel writer
- Enoch Louis Lowe (1820–1892), American politician
- Ernest Anthony Lowe (1928–2014), British economist
- Ethan Lowe (born 1991), Australian rugby player

=== F ===
- Florence Leontine Lowe (1901–1975), American aviator
- Sir Francis Lowe, 1st Baronet (1852–1929), British politician
- Frank Lowe (1943–2003), American saxophonist and composer
- Frank Lowe (advertiser) (born 1941), British businessman
- Fred Lowe (born 1947), American weightlifter

=== G ===
- Gary Lowe (1934–2017), American football player
- Gavin Lowe (born 1995), Scottish rugby player
- Gavin Lowe (computer scientist), American computer scientist
- George Lowe (disambiguation)
- Georgina Lowe, British television producer
- Gerry Lowe (rugby league, born 1927) (1927–2018), English rugby player
- Gordon Lowe (1884–1972), British tennis player
- Greg Lowe, American mountain climber
- Gregg Lowe (born 1986), British actor
- Graham Lowe (born 1946), New Zealand rugby coach

=== H ===
- H. F. Lowe, English cricketer
- Hannah Lowe (born 1976), British writer
- Harold Lowe (1882–1944), fifth officer on the RMS Titanic
- Harry Lowe (disambiguation), multiple people
- Hudson Lowe (1769–1844), Anglo-Irish military officer and Governor of St Helena

=== I ===
- Ian Lowe (born 1942), Australian scientist
- Isaac Lowe (born 1994), English professional boxer

=== J ===
- Jack Lowe Jr. (born 1939), American businessman
- Jack Lowe Sr. (1913–1980), American businessman
- Jacques Lowe (1930–2001), German photographer, President John F. Kennedy's official photographer
- Jaiman Lowe (born 1980), Australian rugby league player
- Jaland Lowe (born 2004), American basketball player
- Jamal Lowe (born 1994), Jamaican footballer
- James Lowe (disambiguation)
- Janet Lowe (1940–2019), American writer
- Jason Lowe (disambiguation)
- Jean Lowe (born 1960), American artist
- Jeff Lowe (1950–2018), American alpinist
- Jemma Lowe (born 1990), British swimmer
- Jesse Lowe (1814–1868), American politician
- Jet Lowe (born 1946), American photographer
- Jez Lowe (born 1955), British musician
- Jim Lowe (1923–2016), American musician
- John Lowe (disambiguation)
- Joseph Lowe (1845–1899), American saloon keeper
- Josh Lowe (born 1998), American baseball player

=== K ===
- Karl Lowe (born 1984), New Zealand rugby player
- Kate Lowe (born 1975), English cricketer
- Keegan Lowe (born 1993), American Canadian hockey player
- Keith Lowe (born 1985), English footballer
- Kendra Lowe (born 1962), English netball player
- Kenneth Gordon Lowe (1917–2010), Scottish physician
- Kenny Lowe (born 1961), English footballer
- Kevin Lowe (born 1959), Canadian ice hockey player, manager and executive

=== L ===
- Lezlie Lowe, Canadian writer and journalist
- Lisa Lowe, American academic

=== M ===
- Mark Lowe (born 1983), American baseball player
- Martha Perry Lowe (1829–1902), American poet, activist
- Mary Lowe (disambiguation)
- Max Lowe (born 1997), English footballer
- Megan Lowe (1915–2017), English cricketer
- Ming C. Lowe (born 1945), American artist
- Mundell Lowe (1922–2017), American jazz guitarist
- Muriel Lowe (1914–1966), English cricketer

=== N ===
- Natalie Lowe (born 1980), Australian ballroom dancer
- Nate Lowe (born 1995), American baseball player
- Nathan Lowe (born 2005), English footballer
- Nathaniel Lowe (born 1995), American baseball player
- Neil Lowe (born 1978), English rugby player
- Nick Lowe (born 1949), British singer
- Nick Lowe (comics) (born 1979), American comic book editor

=== O ===
- Omare Lowe (born 1978), American football player
- Onandi Lowe (born 1974), Jamaican soccer player

=== P ===
- Paddy Lowe (born 1962), British racing engineer
- Paul Lowe (born 1936), American football player
- Paul Lowe (photographer) (1963–2024), British photojournalist, educator, writer and critic
- Paul A. Lowe Jr. (born 1959), American politician
- Pearl Lowe (born 1970), British musician
- Percy Lowe (1870–1948), English surgeon and ornithologist
- Peter Lowe (disambiguation)
- Phil Lowe (born 1950), English rugby player
- Philip Lowe (born 1961), Australian economist

=== R ===
- Rachel Lowe (born 1977), British entrepreneur
- Rachel Lowe (soccer) (born 2000), Australian soccer player
- Ralph P. Lowe (1805–1883), American politician
- Rebecca Lowe (born 1980), British journalist
- Richard Barrett Lowe (1902–1972), Governor of American Samoa and Governor of Guam
- Richard Thomas Lowe (1802–1874) British naturalist
- Rob Lowe (born 1964), American actor and game show host
- Robert Lowe (disambiguation)
- Robson Lowe (1905–1997), British philatelist
- Rosemary Lowe (1921–2014), English ichthyologist, ecologist and limnologist
- Rosie Lowe (born 1989), English singer and songwriter
- Ross Lowe (1928–1955), Canadian hockey player
- Rupert Lowe (born 1957), British politician and businessman
- Ruth Lowe (1914–1981), Canadian pianist and songwriter
- Ryan Lowe (born 1978), English football player and manager

=== S ===
- Sam Lowe (1867–1947), English cricketer
- Sammy Lowe (1918–1993), American trumpeter, arranger and conductor
- Sean Lowe (disambiguation)
- Sid Lowe (born 1976), British journalist
- Sidney Lowe (born 1960), American basketball player and coach
- Sidney Lowe (priest) (1882–1968), Anglican Archdeacon of Bradford
- Simon Lowe (born 1973), British actor
- Sophie Lowe (born 1990), English-born Australian actress
- Stephen Lowe (disambiguation)
- Steven Lowe, British writer
- Susan Lowe (born 1948), American actress

=== T ===
- Ted Lowe (1920–2011), British snooker commentator
- Thaddeus S. C. Lowe (1832–1913), American aeronaut, scientist and inventor
- Thomas Lowe (disambiguation)
- Tiffany Anastasia Lowe (born 1972), daughter of musician Carlene Carter
- Titus Lowe (1877–1959), English-born American clergyman
- Todd Lowe (born 1977), American actor
- Tom Lowe (disambiguation)
- Trent Lowe (born 1984), Australian cyclist

=== V ===
- Vaughan Lowe (born 1952), British lawyer
- Vederian Lowe (born 1999), American football player

=== W ===
- William C. Lowe (1941–2013), American engineer and businessman
- William H. M. Lowe (1861–1944), British army officer
- William M. Lowe (1842–1882), American politician
- William W. Lowe (1873–1945), English cricketer
- Willoughby Prescott Lowe (1872–1949), English ornithologist and naturalist
- Woodrow Lowe (1954–2025), American football player

=== Z ===
- Zane Lowe (born 1973), New Zealand disc jockey

== Fictional characters ==
- Alex Lowe (American Horror Story), a character in American Horror Story: Hotel
- Emilio Lowe, an archer in the anime Black Cat
- Leonard Lowe, in the film Awakenings, played by Robert De Niro

== See also ==
- General Lowe (disambiguation)
- Governor Lowe (disambiguation)
- Judge Lowe (disambiguation)
- Senator Lowe (disambiguation)
- Lau (surname)
- Low (surname)
- Löw (disambiguation)
- Lowe
- Loewe (surname)
- Lowes (disambiguation)
- Louw
- Liu (surname)
