= George Lowe (disambiguation) =

George Lowe (1957–2025) was an American comedian and voice actor.

George Lowe may also refer to:

- George Lowe (baseball) (1895–1981), American Major League pitcher
- George Lowe (cricketer, born 1915) (1915–2008), English cricketer
- George Lowe (cricketer, born 1878) (1878–1932), English cricketer
- George Lowe (New Zealand cricketer) (1847–1922), New Zealand cricketer
- George Lowe (mountaineer) (1924–2013), New Zealand-born mountaineer
- George Lowe (rugby union) (born 1989), English rugby union player
- George Lowe (MP) (c. 1594–1682), English politician
- George Lowe (American alpinist) (born 1944), American alpinist
- George W. Lowe, minister and member of the Arkansas House of Representatives
- Bulger Lowe (1895–1939), American football player, coach, and official

== See also ==
- George Low (disambiguation)
