= Mrs. Lowe =

Mrs. Lowe may refer to:

- Mrs. Lowe, a character from the 1990 film Awakenings
- Mrs. Lowe, a character from the 1973 film The Train Robbers
- Mrs. Lowe, a character from the 1960 film Comanche Station
- Mrs. Lowe, a character from the 2015 film Experimenter
- Mrs. Lowe, a character from the 1918 film The Eyes of Julia Deep

== See also ==
- Lowe (surname)
