= Richard Lowe (cricketer, born 1869) =

English cricketer

Personal information
- Full name: Richard Lowe
- Born: 18 June 1869; Kirkby-in-Ashfield, Nottinghamshire
- Died: 3 July 1946 (aged 77); Kirkby-in-Ashfield, Nottinghamshire
- Batting: Right-handed
- Bowling: Left-arm medium
- Relatives: Sam Lowe (brother); Tom Lowe (brother)

Domestic team information
- Years: Team
- 1893–1894: Sussex
- 1897–1901: Glamorgan

Career statistics
Competition	First-class
Matches	15
Runs scored	183
Batting average	10.76
100s/50s	0/0
Top score	34*
Balls bowled	1,197
Wickets	22
Bowling average	26.27
5 wickets in innings	0
10 wickets in match	0
Best bowling	4/26
Catches/stumpings	5/–
- Source: Cricinfo, 14 July 2012

Richard Lowe (18 June 1869 – 3 July 1946) was an English cricketer. Lowe was a right-handed batsman who bowled left-arm medium pace. He was born at Kirkby-in-Ashfield in Nottinghamshire.

Lowe made his first-class cricket debut for Lord Sheffield's XI against the Marylebone Cricket Club at Sheffield Park in 1891. His next first-class appearance came in his debut match for Sussex in the 1893 County Championship against Nottinghamshire at Trent Bridge. He made thirteen further first-class appearances for the county, the last of which came against Surrey in the 1894 County Championship.

He later joined Glamorgan, making his debut for the Welsh county against Monmouthshire in the 1897 Minor Counties Championship. He played minor counties cricket for Glamorgan from 1897 to 1901, making a total of 42 appearances, the last of which came against Devon. In addition to playing county cricket, he also played for Rishton in 1895 and Church in 1896 in the Lancashire League. He died at the town of his birth on 3 July 1946. His brothers, Sam and Tom, both played first-class cricket.
