= Core International =

US-based computer and technology corporation

Core International, Inc.
- Type: Private
- Industry: Computer hardware and Computer software
- Founded: 1979 Incorporated 1981 in Florida, United States
- Founder: Hal Prewitt
- Headquarters: Originally Boca Raton, Florida
- Key people: After sale: Dr. Susumu Yoshida; Hajime Unoki; Yoshio Ishigaki
- Products: Computer data storage; Disk array; Hard disk drives; Backup software; Personal computers
- Total assets: Unknown
- Website: www.sony.com

CORE International Inc., commonly referred to as Core, was a multinational computer and technology corporation headquartered in Boca Raton, Florida.

Core was founded in 1979 by Hal Prewitt as a technology firm to develop, market, and support computer-related products and services. It was known for supporting IBM's first business microcomputers, such as the 5100, 5110, and 5120. With the introduction of the IBM PC and PC AT, the company provided a line of disk drives, backup solutions, and personal computer products. Core remained a private company solely owned by Prewitt until 1993, when it was purchased by Aiwa, a wholly owned subsidiary of Sony.

== History ==
=== 1975–1980: Founding ===
Core was founded by Prewitt to sell and program mini computers, assemble micro-computers, computer peripherals, and integrate them into business computer systems.

Core was marketed as an association and created as a for-profit organization, specifically for users of the IBM 5100 Series and IBM System/23. The company's objective was to distribute computer supplies via mail order, deliver pre-developed (off-the-shelf) software, and provide hardware maintenance services. Supplies included printer ribbons, paper, diskettes, and tape cartridges. Software ranged from mortgage interest calculators, word processing, games, and utilities to payroll, accounting, and Industry-Specific Applications.

Users of the IBM 5100 Series were referred to Core by IBM sales representatives.

=== 1981–1983: Hard disk drives, LAN and PC for IBM 5100 series ===
In September 1982, Core announced the availability of the first hard disk drives and local area network (LAN) for the IBM 5100 Series. Previously sold IBM systems were storage-limited and lacked network option; the 5100 had tape, while the 5110 and 5120 restricted to 1.2 Mb floppy disks. Core drives were available starting at 10 Mb and increased up to 160 Mb in removable and fixed configurations.

Core-Net, the LAN built into each Core storage system, allowed interconnection of up to eight IBM 5100 Series systems, enabling shared storage and data. This configuration pre-dated LANs of the period for the IBM PC and compatibles.

In 1983, Core introduced two major solutions as IBM was withdrawing from marketing the IBM 5100 series. First software called PC51 allowed 5100 series computer programs written in BASIC to run unmodified on the IBM PC and compatibles under MS-DOS. Second, a LAN card for the IBM PC and compatibles that provided connection to the IBM 5100 Series network.

=== 1984–1986: Educating the marketplace, IBM VAD, hard disk drives, PC and backup ===
In 1984, Core entered the personal computer (PC) marketplace. The company's first product introduced the year before, called PC-51, was an operating system (and language) for the IBM PC and compatibles. It enabled a PC to function like an IBM 5110/5120 system.

This new product opened up an unexplored marketplace for Core by allowing the company to become an IBM value-added reseller and sell both the IBM PC and Core products individually and as a combined package. IBM authorized and promoted this relationship. As a result of the early development effort for the IBM 5100 series, Core released its own family of hard disk drives called the ATplus Series.

A few weeks after the introduction of the new IBM AT in August 1984, Core discovered problems in the factory-issued hard disk drive. As the media and marketplace became aware of IBM's disk problems, Core began offering alternative solutions during a period of limited competition. For more than six months, the IBM AT model with the CMI was in short supply. Delays were attributed to lack of drives, technical problems with the machine, and other issues.

Core desired a major partner and established a collaboration with Control Data Corporation (CDC) to work on the introduction of the drives for the PC marketplace. The announcement was made in February 1985.

Purchasers of the IBM AT reported some dealers were installing inferior drives into the computer without disclosing this fact. Core developed the DiskP program, later replaced by the COREtest (DOS based), to identify sub-standard products by providing a visual demonstration of the speed and comparative measurements of hard disk drives and controllers. Many computer publications, hardware manufacturers, distributors, dealers and independent evaluation firms employed COREtest for product comparison, which led to widespread citation of COREtest in computing publications and evaluation reports.
