= Charles Low =

Charles Low may refer to:

- Charles Low, 2nd Baron Aldington (born 1948), British peer
- Charles Rathbone Low (1837–1918), Indian Navy officer and writer
- Chuck Low (1928–2017), American businessman and actor

== See also ==
- Charles Lowe (disambiguation)
