= 5110 =

5110 may refer to:

- 5110 BCE, a year in the 6th millennium BC
- 5110, a number in the 5000 (number) range
- 5110 Belgirate, an asteroid in the Asteroid Belt, the 5110th asteroid registered
- IBM 5110, a luggable computer
- Nokia 5110, a cellphone
- Nord 5110, a French air-to-surface missile
