= Edward Lowe =

Edward, Eddie or Ed Lowe may refer to:

Ordered chronologically

- Edward Lowe (composer) (c. 1610–1682), organist, composer and Oxford professor of music
- Edward Low or Edward Lowe (1690–1724), English pirate
- Edward Löwe (1794–1880), also Loewe or Lowe, English chess master
- Edward Clarke Lowe (1823–1912), English educator
- Edward Joseph Lowe (1825–1900), English botanist
- Edward T. Lowe Jr. (1880-1973), American film producer & writer
- Ed Lowe (businessman) (1920–1995), American businessman and inventor of cat litter
- Eddie Lowe (footballer) (1925–2009), English football player and manager
- Ed Lowe (journalist) (1946–2011), American newspaper columnist
- Eddie Lowe (Canadian football) (born 1960), American politician and former linebacker in the Canadian Football League
- Ed Lowe (cyclist) (born 2003), English track cyclist
- E. J. Lowe (philosopher) (Edward Jonathan Lowe, 1950–2014), British philosopher and academic
