= IBM 5120 =

1980 portable business computer

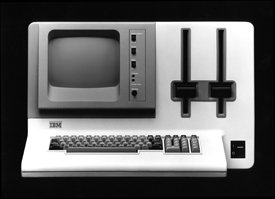
- Manufacturer: IBM
- Type: Professional Computer
- Released: February 1980; 46 years ago
- Introductory price: US$13,500 (equivalent to $52,800 in 2025)
- Media: 2 × 8-inch 1.2 MB floppy disk drives
- Operating system: APL, BASIC
- CPU: IBM PALM processor
- Memory: 16–64 KB RAM (with 16 KB iterations); 64 KB ROM
- Display: 9-inch CRT
- Input: Keyboard
- Weight: 45 kg (99 lb)
- Predecessor: IBM 5110
- Successor: IBM Datamaster

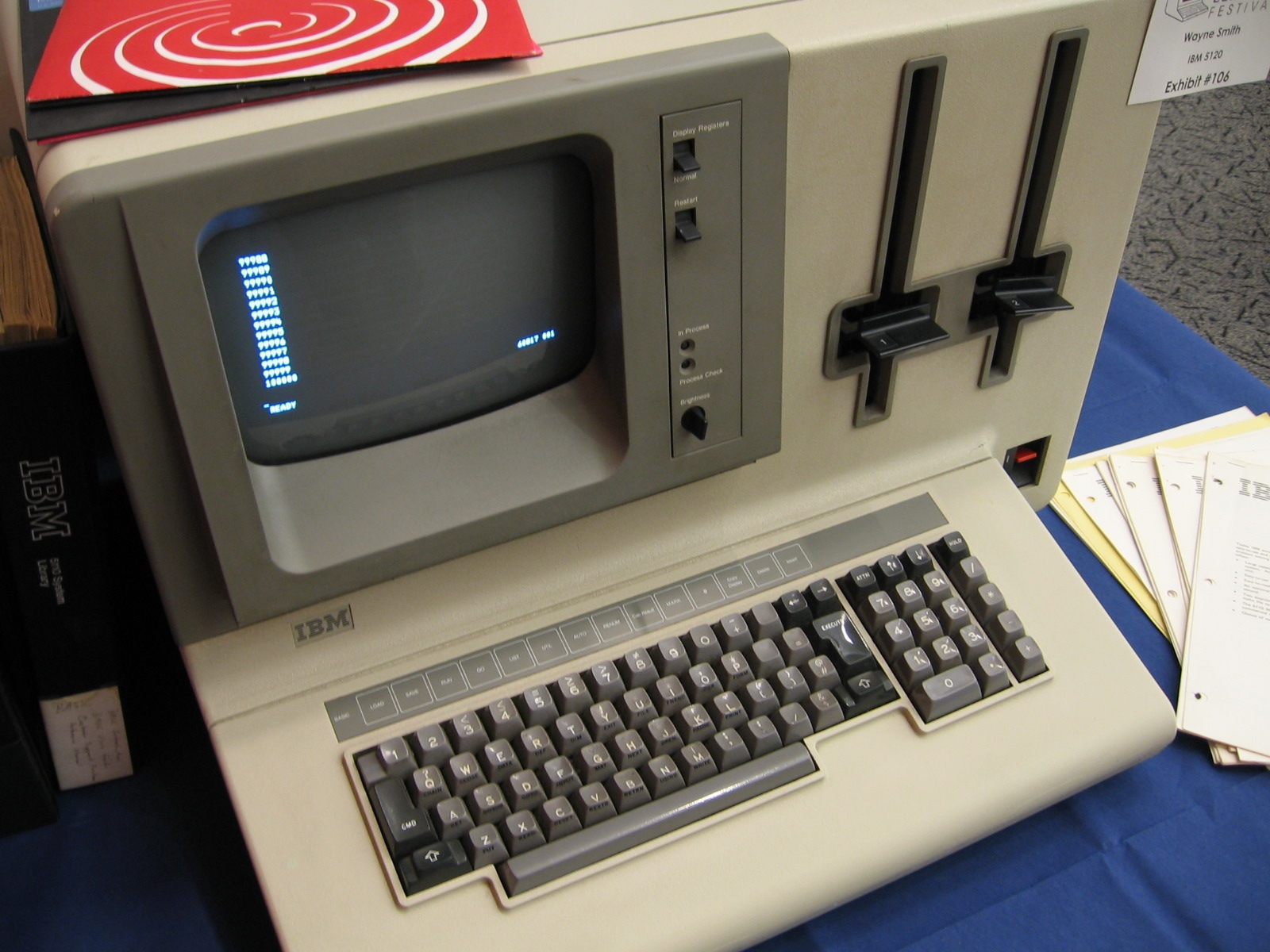
Closeup of a running 5120

The IBM 5120 Computing System (sometimes referred to as the IBM 5110 Model 3) is a 16-bit microcomputer developed by IBM and released in February 1980. Marketed as the desktop follow-on to the portable IBM 5110 Computing System, it featured two built-in 8-inch 1.2 MB floppy disk drives, an integrated 9-inch monochrome monitor, 32 KB RAM, plus an optional IBM 5114 stand-alone diskette unit with two additional 8-inch 1.2 MB floppy disk drives.

The system was sold with both APL and BASIC languages in ROM, and provided a toggle switch on the front panel to select the language. APL allowed numerous business software written on IBM minicomputers to run on the 5120.

== Description ==
It was launched in 1980 as the lowest-priced IBM business computer to date. Depending on the options the overall system prices ranged from $9,340 to $23,990. To emphasize its office image IBM released six new programs that year: task inventory, billing, payroll, accounts payable, accounts receivable and general ledger accounting.

Aside from larger screen size and performance benefits over its predecessor, the IBM 5120 design incorporated several usability advantages:

- Reduced 'footprint' requiring less desktop space
- Reduced glare on monitor, keytop and product surfaces
- Ease of handling/lifting based on bottom form treatment
- Reduced static loading in arms and shoulders due to keyboard palm rest

For its usability features and appearance, the IBM 5120 was recognized with two major industrial design awards and described with terms such as "clean, well thought out"; "subtle detailing shows great care in execution"; and "looks like quality″.

IBM did not offer a LAN or hard disk drive for these systems. However, in 1981, Hal Prewitt, founder of Core International, Inc, invented and marketed the world's first and only hard disk subsystems and "CoreNet", a LAN used to share programs and data for the IBM 5110 and 5120 systems. In 1984, Core introduced PC51, software that ran unmodified 5100 Series computer programs written in BASIC on the IBM PC and compatibles under PC DOS and shared programs and data on CoreNet, the LAN for all these models.

The 5120 was withdrawn from marketing on 10 December 1982.

== Timeline ==
Timeline of the IBM Personal Computer

Asterisk (*) denotes a model released in Japan only
