= Thomas Lowe =

Thomas or Tom Lowe may refer to:

- Thomas Lowe (tenor) (1719–1783), English opera singer and actor
- Thomas Lowe (priest) (1781–1861), Anglican Dean of Exeter
- Thomas Lowe (politician) (1812–1875), mayor of Atlanta, 1861
- Thomas Lowe (footballer) (1871-1917), English footballer for Burton Swifts/Wanderers, see 1894–95 Manchester City F.C. season
- Thomas Hunter Lowe (1928–1984), American judge and politician in Maryland
- Tom Lowe (writer) (fl. 1998–2010), writer and filmmaker from Southern California
- Tom Lowe (radio) (born 1975), British radio broadcaster
- Tom Lowe (performer) (born 1978), English-born singer and actor who featured on American Idol
- Thomas Lowe (Lord Mayor) (died 1623), English politician and Lord Mayor of London in 1604
- Tom Lowe (cricketer) (1859–1934), English cricketer

== See also ==
- Tommy Lowes, English footballer
