= Hal Prewitt =

American artist, photographer, race car driver, inventor (b. 1954)

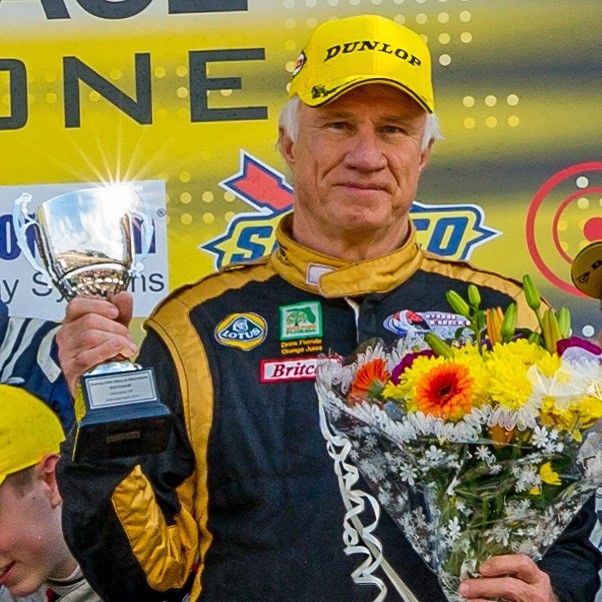
- 2015 Podium at 24 hours of Silverstone
- Born: Harold D. Prewitt Jr. October 1, 1954 (age 71); Hutchinson, Kansas, U.S.
- Occupations: Race car driver, artist, investor, businessman and farmer
- Title: Commissioner, Town of Manalapan, Florida
- Term: 2001
- Political party: Republican
- Spouse(s): Corinne Loria (2007–present); Florine Andrews (1980–2004)
- Children: 3

Harold D. Prewitt Jr. (born October 1, 1954, in Hutchinson, Kansas) is an American businessman, inventor, artist, and race car driver. During the 1970s and 1980s, he worked on the development of personal computer software and hardware for IBM microcomputer systems.

Prewitt founded and managed several technology companies, including Core International, which developed disk array, data storage, and backup products. The company produced hot-swappable disk drives, controllers, host adapters, and power supplies. Prewitt served as chairman and chief executive officer until 1993, when the company was acquired by Aiwa.

== Early life ==
=== Youth ===
Prewitt was born in Hutchinson, Kansas. His father was a veteran of World War II and the Korean War, who later worked as a mailman for the United States Postal Service and was honored as a Kentucky Colonel by the Governor of Kentucky. His mother was a nurse. Prewitt grew up in the Daytona Beach, Florida, area from 1963 to 1976. Here, he had his first exposure to auto racing, volunteering at Daytona International Speedway. In 1967, at the age of 13, he built his first computer, which performed simple math and operated his phonograph.

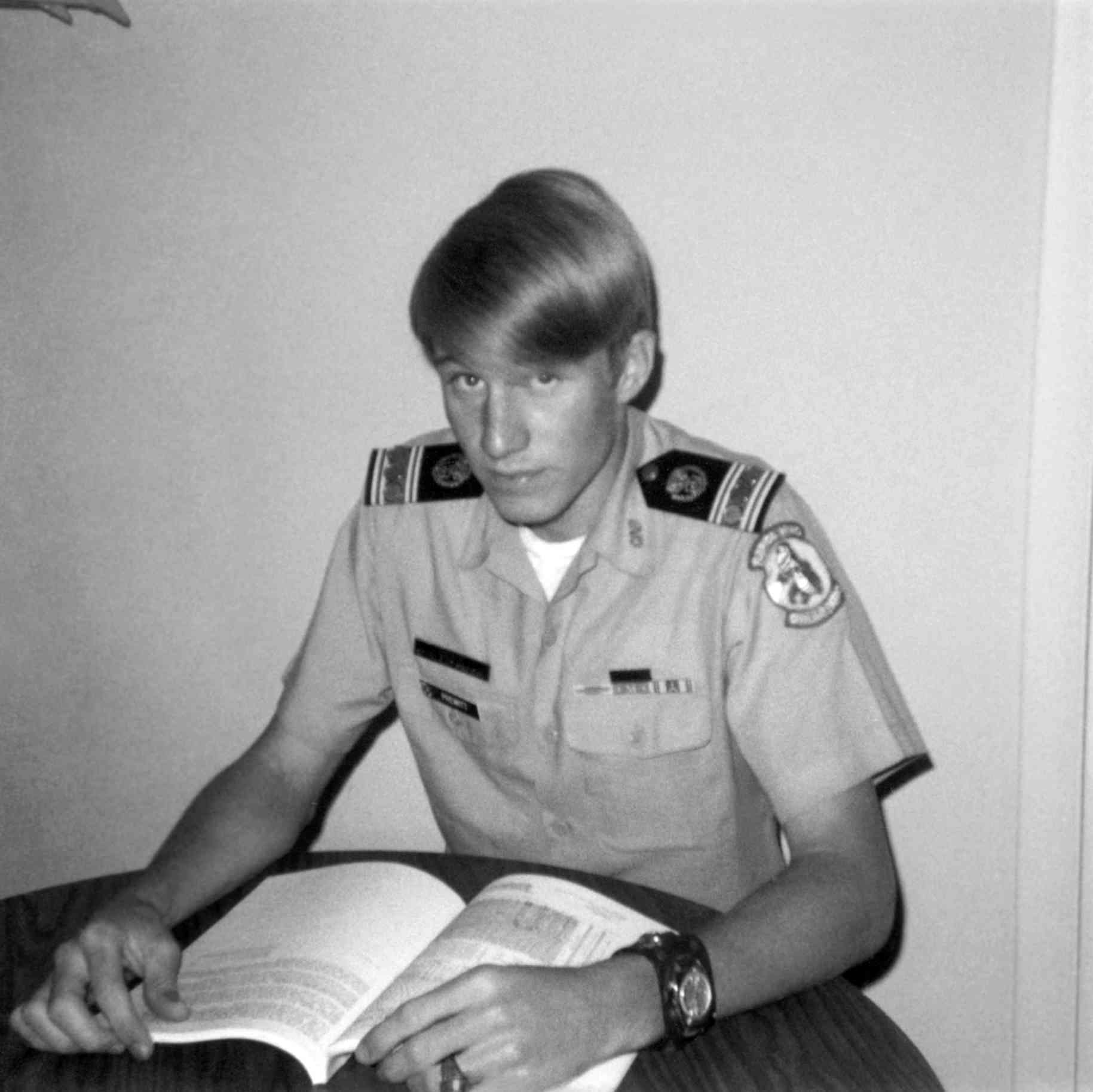
1970 Cadet Captain Prewitt

Prewitt joined the Civil Air Patrol as a cadet and earned the second-highest rank (Cadet Lt. Colonel). He sold his first artwork, a painting, at the age of 16.

As a teenager, Prewitt learned sailing, fishing, boating, and scuba diving and developed skills in mechanics, engineering, electronics, navigation, and construction. He was interested in painting and photography, producing and selling a number of images.

After graduating from high school, Prewitt continued building boats, managing his business, and began to focus on computer programming. Between 1972 and 1975, he learned various programming languages using an IBM 1130. In the early 1970s, Prewitt unsuccessfully sought venture capital in a plan to design, build, and sell small business computers at lower prices than available at the time. In 1975, he built an Altair 8800. That same year, Prewitt obtained his first business application customer when he sold, designed, and wrote computer programs for the IBM 5100 and System/32 as part of the business he had started at age 16. He joined the Sports Car Club of America (SCCA) and participated in autocross events.

=== Education ===
After high school, Prewitt attended Daytona Beach Community College (1972–76), studying business and computer science, but left without earning a degree. He transferred to Florida Atlantic University (1976–78), Boca Raton, Florida, where he continued his studies in business and computer science; however, he eventually dropped out of college to focus on his business.

== Business career ==
Prewitt began working at an early age. As a teenager, he held various jobs, including construction work for a home builder in Ormond Beach, Florida, as well as restaurant work as a busser, dishwasher, and cook. By the mid-1970s, he had started a small business and sold a painting.

While attending community college, Prewitt worked in boat construction and marina operations at Howard Boat Works, and also held positions as a painter and accountant. His later employment included work as a laboratory assistant at his college and as a computer programmer for a firm providing business applications for mainframe and minicomputer systems.

=== Ranger Systems ===
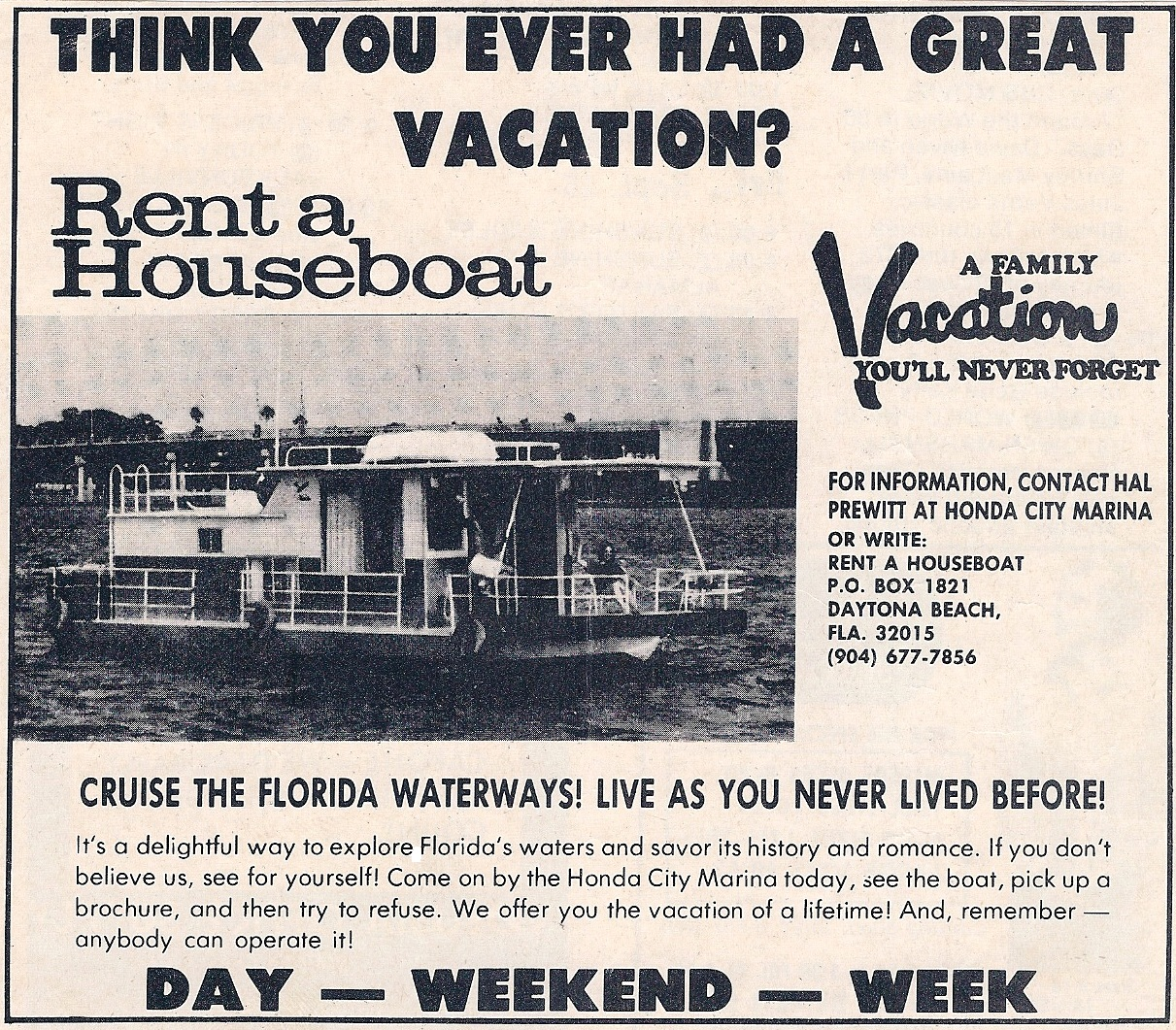
Ranger Systems' 1972 ad for Rent A Houseboat

In 1970, while in high school, Prewitt started his first business, Ranger Systems. The company had four divisions: Ranger Manufacturing, Business World, Rent a Houseboat and Ranger Automotive Engineering.

Prewitt used the manufacturing part of the business to build electronics, computers, and fiberglass boats. Business World did marketing, photography, printing and advertising. Prewitt wrote brochures, shot pictures, placed ads and ran a printing press. The largest and most profitable division was Rent a Houseboat, through which Prewitt rented out his family's boat. He sometimes used a small boat to travel to school and quickly reach the houseboat. Prewitt did everything from writing contracts to maintenance, while the automotive division focused on repairs.

Prewitt operated Ranger Systems until 1975, when his focus switched to computer programming and the personal computer industry.

=== International Computer ===
In 1975, Prewitt created International Computer to continue building, selling, installing and programming computers. He also started developing storage devices, which later became his most successful products.

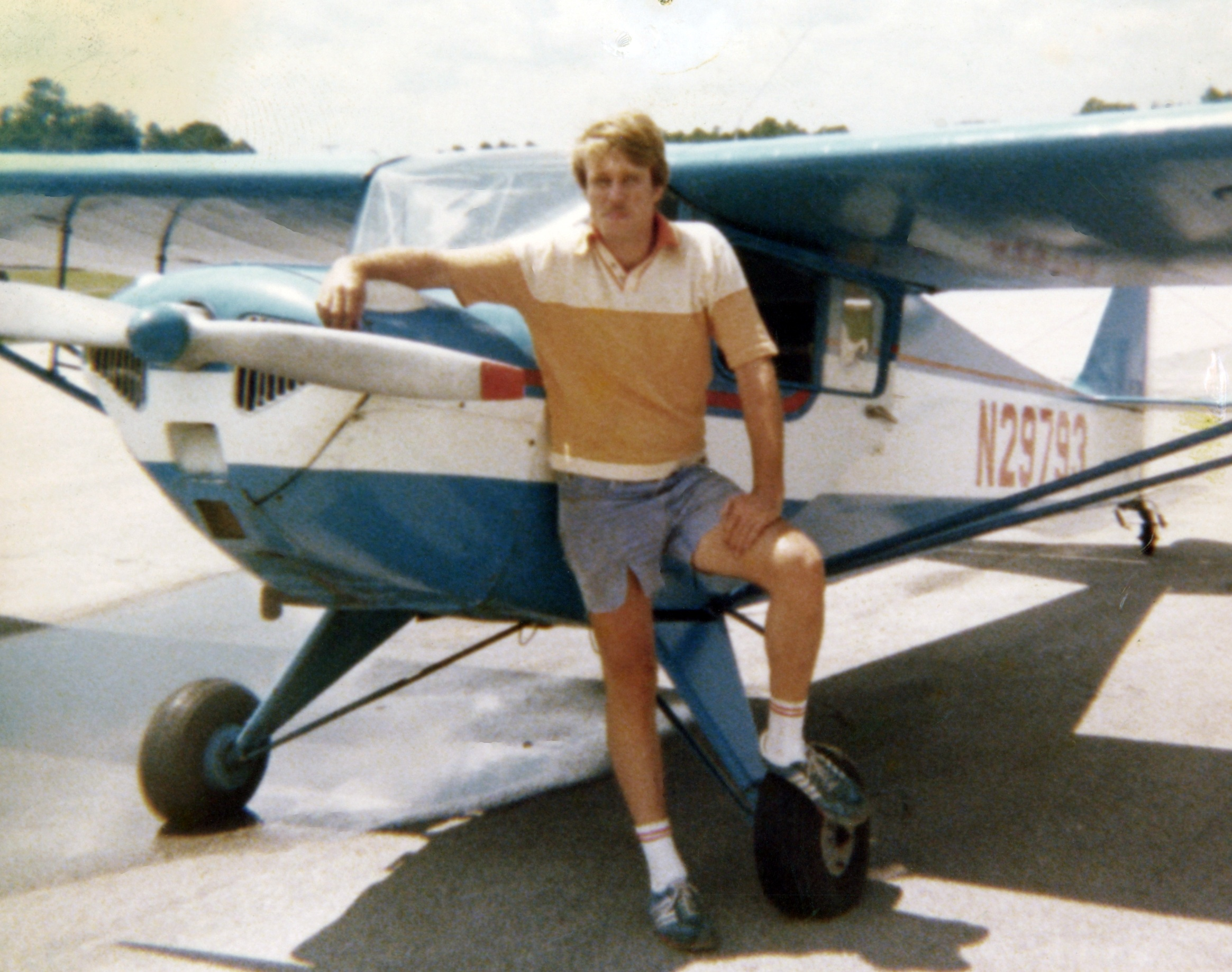
Prewitt with his 1941 Taylorcraft in 1979

Prewitt's customer base was located from mid to south Florida in manufacturing, hotel, service, legal, medical, construction and agricultural industries. Prewitt flew to their offices by initially renting aircraft and then by using his own.

Prewitt started Southeast Computer Consultants with a partner in late 1977.

=== Core International (Core) ===
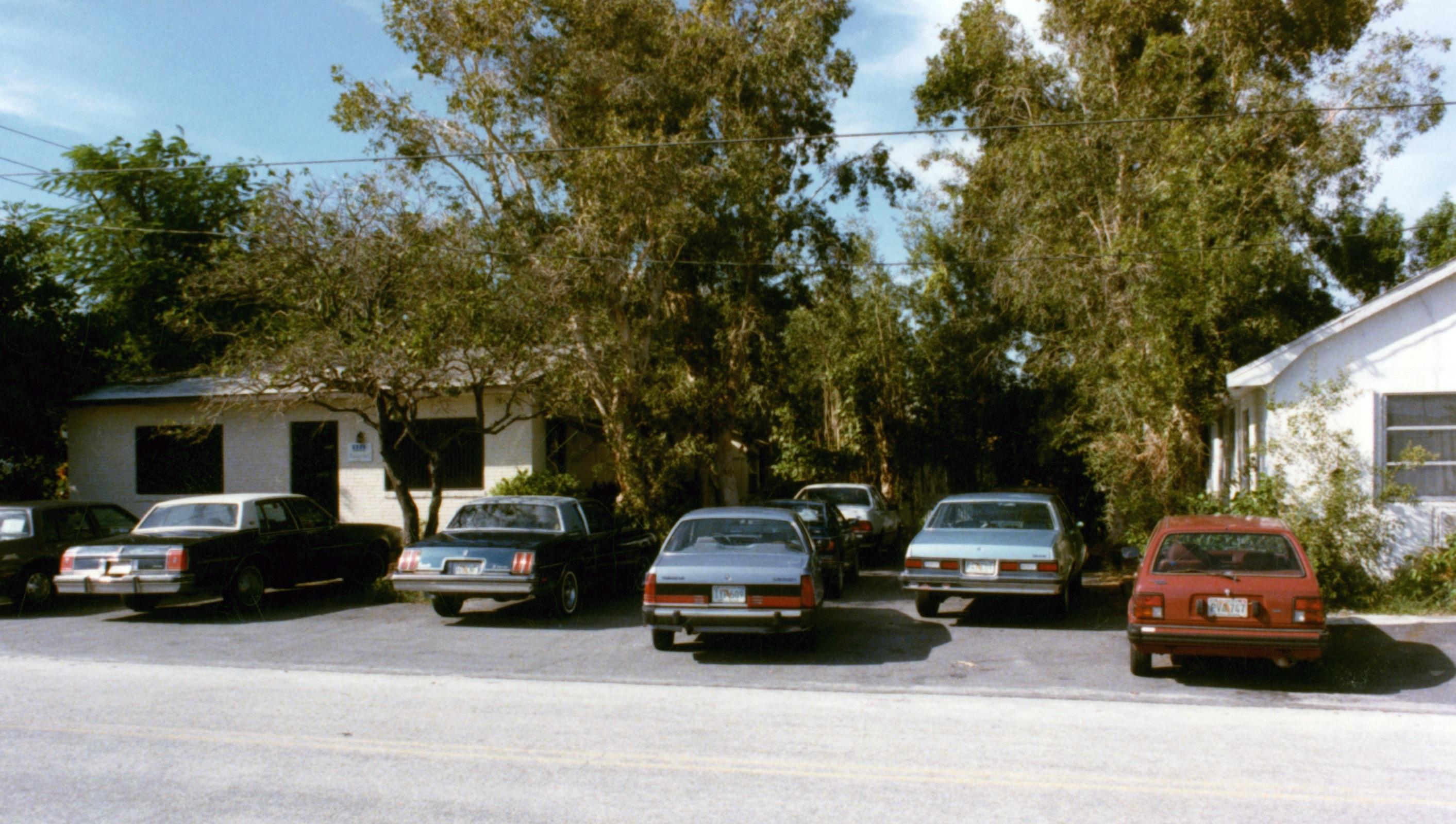
Core's 1979–85 Delray Beach, FL premises, two small homes converted to offices where Prewitt also lived.

In late 1979, Prewitt founded Core International from the assets of International Computer and Southeast Computer Consultants. The company developed hardware and software for IBM 5110-series systems, including external storage products addressing the lack of built-in hard drives. Core later expanded into disk arrays, data storage, and backup products, and grew to operate internationally, with offices in Europe and Asia.

In 1986, Inc. magazine ranked Core 21st on its Inc. 500 list of fastest-growing private companies. Prewitt served as chairman and chief executive officer until 1993, when the company was sold to Aiwa.

=== Later career ===
Prewitt is the managing member of Prewitt Enterprises, a Florida-based agricultural and investment business he founded in 2004, with offices in Boca Raton and Miami, Florida, and in Park City, Utah. The agricultural part of the business grows oranges, and is a major supplier of orange juice to Tropicana's Pure Premium.

In 2012, Prewitt founded Prewitt Management, a Florida-based art business with offices in Boca Raton and Miami, Florida and Park City, Utah. Prewitt's art includes oils, acrylics, pencil drawings and photography, and some of his artworks were displayed in his gallery on Main Street, Park City, Utah until the summer of 2017.

== Sporting career ==
=== Racing ===
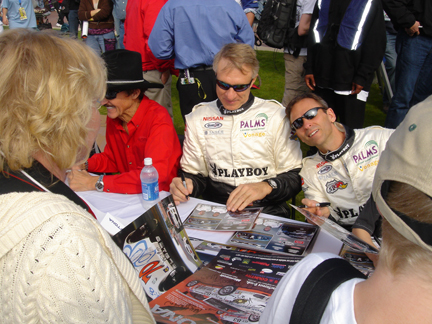
Hal Prewitt signing fan autographs with Richard Petty and David Murry when racing in the 2007 24 Hours of Daytona and driving for Playboy

Prewitt first became active in racing while growing up in Daytona Beach, Florida in the 1970s and driving in SCCA events. He became serious in 2004 after attending Skip Barber Racing School.

Prewitt was a professional level driver for various teams in international and North American endurance road race events. From 2004 to 2006, he set numerous lap records in Sports Car Club of America, PBOC Motorsports Club and National Auto Sport Association (NASA) classes, and was the overall winner in the PBOC 2005 and 2006 Race Series season. In 2006 and 2007, Prewitt won numerous first place and class wins in Historic Sportscar Racing (HSR), Rolex Endurance Series and the Historic GT Series. He won the 2006 National Auto Sport Association National Championship at Mid-Ohio Sports Car Course, driving the Porsche 911 GT3 RS that won second place in class for the 2003 24 Hours of Le Mans.

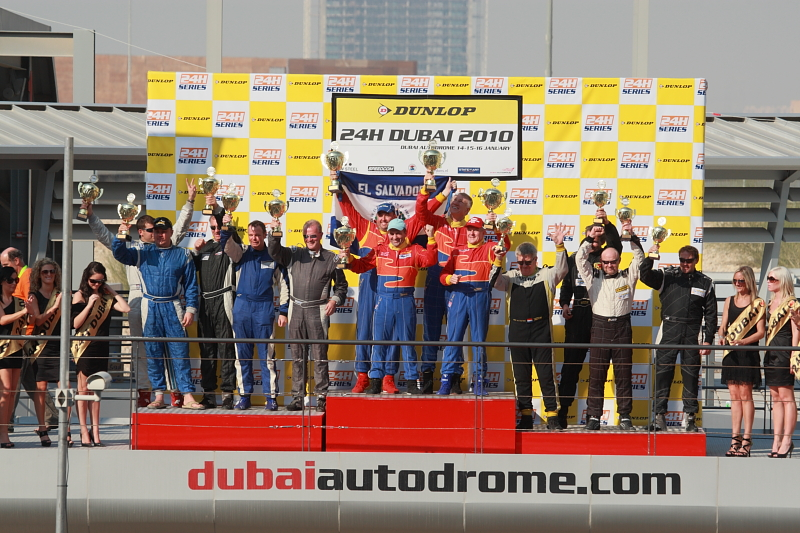
2010 Win at 24 hours of Dubai. Drivers Hal Prewitt, Cor Euser, Toto Lassally and Jim Briody

Prewitt retired in 2015 after driving in more than 200 events. In his final year (2015), he finished as the No. 1 American and fourth out of 819 international drivers from 58 countries in the 2015 International Endurance Series Championship. He qualified for a career total of 200 races (140 Sprint and 60 Endurance) and drove in 30 endurance events (24 hours or longer) at 33 tracks in races held by IMSA (part of NASCAR), and others in the US and international events. He has won 73 firsts, 30 seconds and 10 third places for 41% wins in 180 starts and for 63% podium finishes. He has a low 3.61% did not finish (DNF) incident rate.

=== Fishing ===
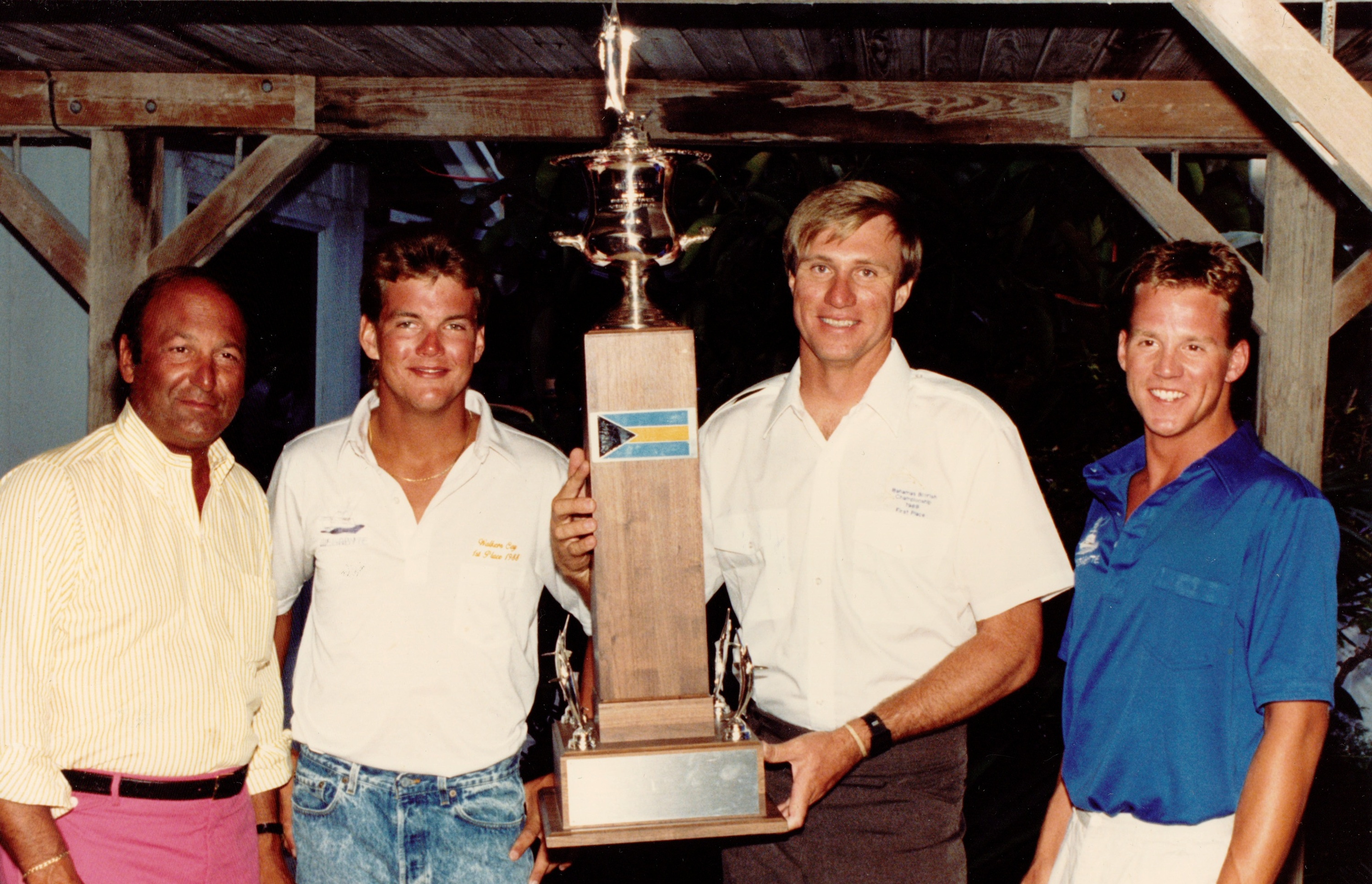
1988 BBC win Hal Prewitt (center) with crew (left to right) Paul Ivey, Todd Simlic and Rick O'Neill

Prewitt is a sport fisherman. Over the years, he has caught and released more than one thousand Billfish with many of them tagged for science research. Most of these were captured "stand up", not using a fishing chair and on light tackle. Prewitt was selected as Atlantic Ocean Angler of the Year 1992, recognized and awarded by International Game Fish Association (IGFA) as the angler who Tagged & Released the most Sailfish in 1990, 1991 and 1992 and White Marlin in 1992. In 1989, Power and Motor-yacht Magazine named him one of America's Top Ten Anglers of 1988.

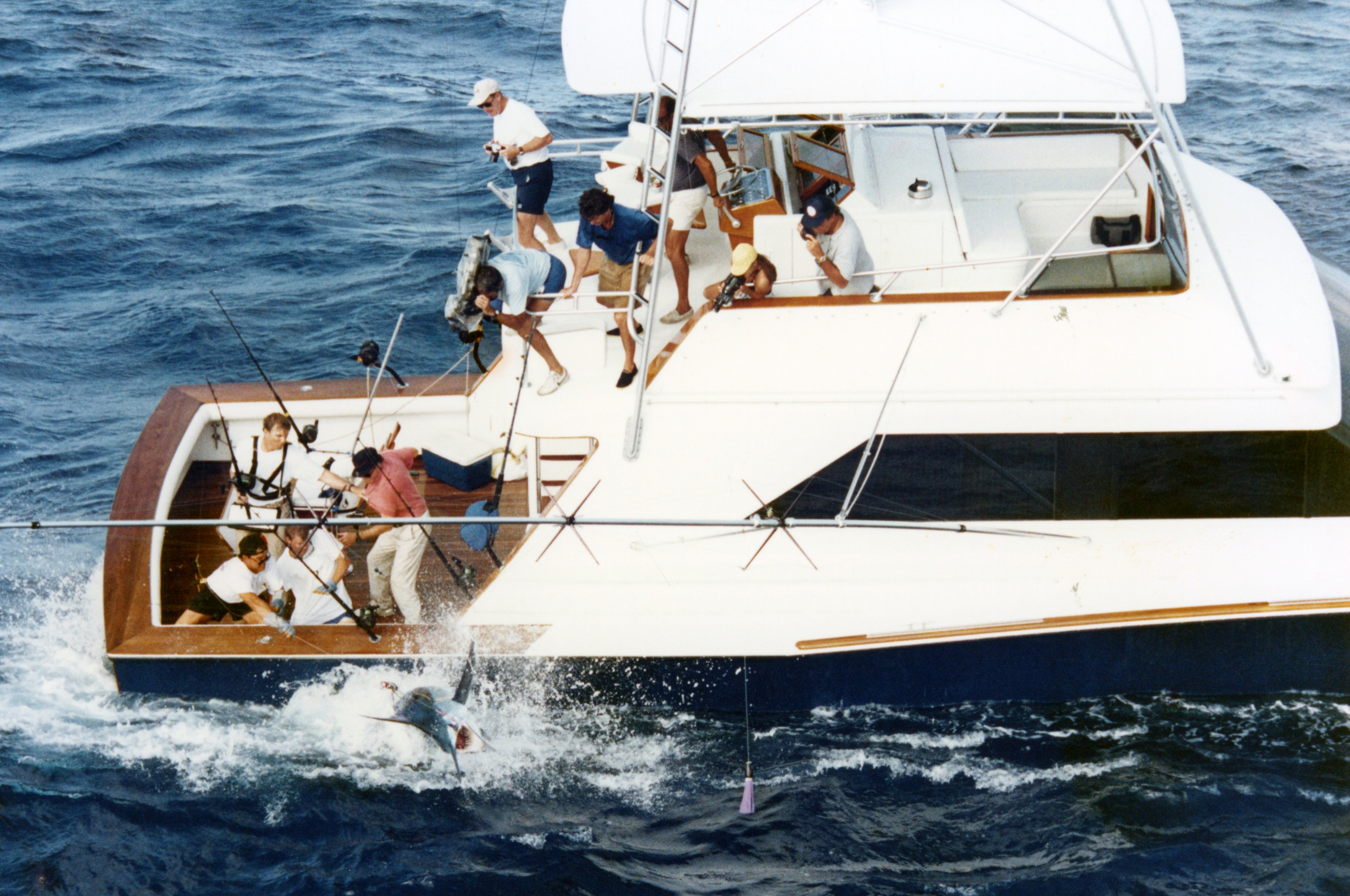
Megabyte in the USVI Open. Angler Hal Prewitt catching a Blue Marlin on "stand up" tackle.

In 1988, Prewitt won the Bahamas Billfish Championship (BBC). This annual award recognizes the overall champion of six tournaments located in the Bahamas held on Bimini, Cat Cay, Walker's Cay, Berry Islands and the Abaco Islands.

== Public service ==
Beginning in the mid-1990s, Prewitt served as a Commissioner on the Architectural and Code Enforcement Boards prior to his 2001 unopposed election to the Town Commission of Manalapan, Florida where he held office until the town was reapportioned in 2002. Prewitt served on the Florida Atlantic University Executive Advisory Board and Palm Beach Countywide Beaches & Shores Council.

== Personal life ==
Prewitt married his first wife, Florine Andrews, in August 1980. They divorced in 2004. They have two sons. He married Corinne Brody, an assistant county manager for Miami-Dade County, in October 2007.
