= IBM 5110 =

Portable computer (1978)

IBM 5110 Computing System
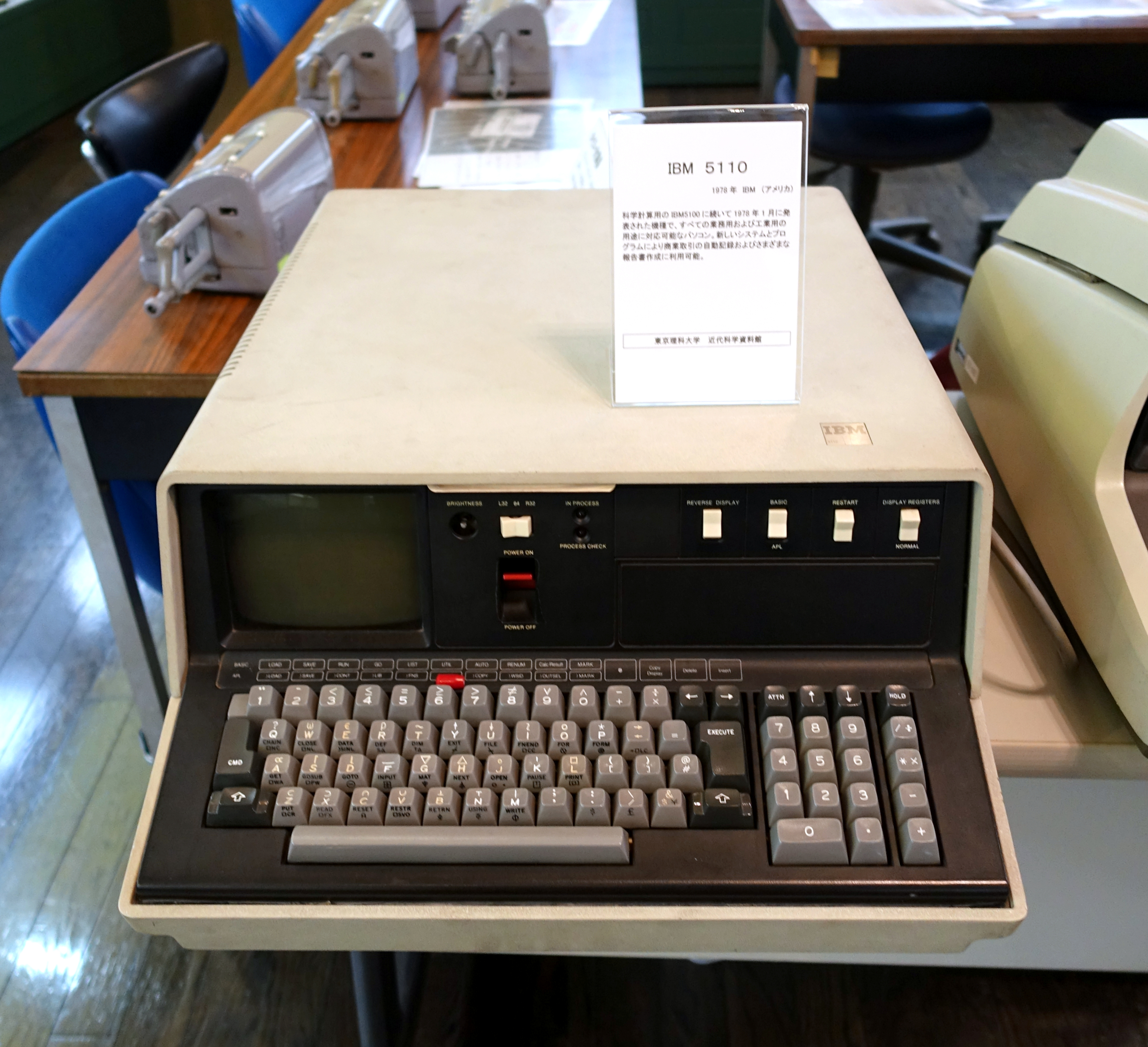
- Released: January 1978; 48 years ago
- Discontinued: March 1982
- CPU: IBM PALM processor
- Memory: 16–64 KB RAM (with 16 KB iterations)
- Display: 5-inch CRT
- Graphics: 64x16 characters
- Predecessor: IBM 5100
- Successor: IBM 5120

The IBM 5110 Computing System is the successor of the IBM 5100 Portable Computer.

The IBM 5110 was announced in January 1978 (a little over 2 years after the introduction of the IBM 5100). Its main differences were support for more I/O devices (floppy disk drives, IEEE-488, RS-232) and a character set (EBCDIC) which was compatible with other IBM machines. These improvements made it partially incompatible with the IBM 5100.

== Variations ==
Three variations of the IBM 5110 were built:

- IBM 5110 Model 1 (with a built-in QIC DC300 tape drive of 204 kB)
- IBM 5110 Model 2 (without the QIC tape drive)
- IBM 5110 Model 3 - also designated as the IBM 5120 (with two built-in 8-inch 1.2 MB floppy disk drives)

== Description ==
The 5110 featured the same housing as the 5100 (although the colors were different), which contained an IBM PALM processor, a keyboard and a 1,024-character display screen. Main memory held 16, 32, 48 or 64 KB of data, depending on the unit. Offering either magnetic tape or diskette storage, the Model 1 could store as much as 204,000 bytes of information per tape cartridge or 1.2 MB on a single 8" diskette; the Model 2 had only diskette storage. Up to two IBM 5114 diskette units, each housing a maximum of two 8" diskette drives, could be attached to the 5110 for a total online diskette capacity of 4.8 MB. The IBM 5110 Model 3 could be connected to only one external IBM 5114 diskette unit. IBM did not offer a LAN or hard disk drive for these systems. However, in 1981 Hal Prewitt, founder of Core International, Inc developed and marketed hard disks and a LAN called "CoreNet" for the IBM 5110 and 5120 systems.

An IBM 5103 printer and an external IBM 5106 auxiliary tape unit (Model 1 only) were available as options from IBM.

Citing the easy use of his new system, Jeff Grube, vice president of Punxsutawney Electric Repair (who received the first IBM 5110 on February 2, 1978), said: "If you can type and use a hand-held calculator, you have all the skills necessary to operate a 5110."

At a Monte Carlo racing event that ran 10 days after the 5110 announcement, five of them were used by race commissioners to retrieve vehicle specifications during the vehicle inspection process. During the race itself five IBM 5100s were used to calculate team and individual results and lap times for the press.

== Programming languages ==
The 5110 was available with either APL or BASIC—or both—programming languages. Machines that supported both languages provided a toggle switch on the front panel to select the language.

In 1984, Core International, Inc introduced PC51 which ran unmodified 5100-Series computer programs written in BASIC on the IBM PC and compatibles under PC DOS and shared programs and data on CoreNet, the LAN for all these models.

== 5110 Software ==
The 5110, designed by the Global Software Development team at IBM Rochester in Rochester, Minnesota, was aimed at GSD's traditional commercial market. The machine was brought in only 90 days from conception to production. It achieved this short timescale under the management of Bill Sydnes, who as a member of Bill Lowe's taskforce later did much the same for the IBM PC. As a business system, IBM offered a number of basic accounting software for a small business. However, companies such as Core International, Inc designed and supported a wide assortment of application programs.

== Model 3 ==
The IBM 5110 Model 3 (also known as the IBM 5120 Computing System) was the desktop version of the 5110.

The 5110 Model 1 and 2 were withdrawn from marketing on 31 March 1982, while the Model 3 was withdrawn on 10 December 1982. IBM continued to support the series until the mid 80s.

== Timeline ==
Timeline of the IBM Personal Computer

Asterisk (*) denotes a model released in Japan only
