= George Low (disambiguation) =

George Low (1926 – 1984) was the president of Rensselaer Polytechnic Institute from 1976 to 1984.

George Low may also refer to:

- G. David Low (1956–2008), American astronaut
- George Low (Medal of Honor) (1847–1912), United States Navy sailor, recipient of the Medal of Honor
- George MacRitchie Low (1849–1922), Scottish actuary
- George Carmichael Low (1872–1952), Scottish parasitologist
- George Low Sr. (1874–1950), Scottish golfer
- George Low Jr. (1912–1995), American golfer, son of George Low Sr.

== See also ==
- George Lowe (disambiguation)
