= Long Island Press =

Monthly periodical from Long Island, New York

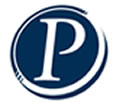
- Type: Monthly Magazine
- Owner: Schneps Communications
- Publisher: Victoria Schneps
- Editor-in-chief: Timothy Bolger
- Founded: 2003; 23 years ago
- Language: English
- Circulation: 57,500 Monthly (as of 2017)
- Price: gratis
- Website: www.longislandpress.com

The Long Island Press is a free monthly news and lifestyle magazine serving Long Island. It is owned by Schneps Media.

== History ==
Its previous print incarnation was as a free, independent print and digital monthly news journal with extensive coverage of local and national news, arts and entertainment, sports and alternative political viewpoints. The newspaper was founded in 2003 by Jed Morey after then parent company, Morey Publishing, bought The Island Ear, which was a free bi-monthly entertainment-oriented newspaper. Morey Publishing renamed the paper, using the same name of a daily newspaper that was forced out of business in 1977, and launched it as a free alternative newsweekly. The staff of the Press included former Newsday columnist Ed Lowe, television columnist Todd Hyman, and technology columnist Lazlow Jones.

On March 24, 2011, New York City's Daily News and Long Island Press announced that the News would print the Press on its state-of-the-art, high-volume, full-color press equipment. In 2014 the Long Island Press ceased printing of its paper to focus solely on their website.

In April 2017, the publication was acquired by Schneps Communications. In July 2017, it was announced that the publication would return to print in September 2017 as a free news and lifestyle monthly.
