= Litter box =

Indoor pet faeces and urine collection box

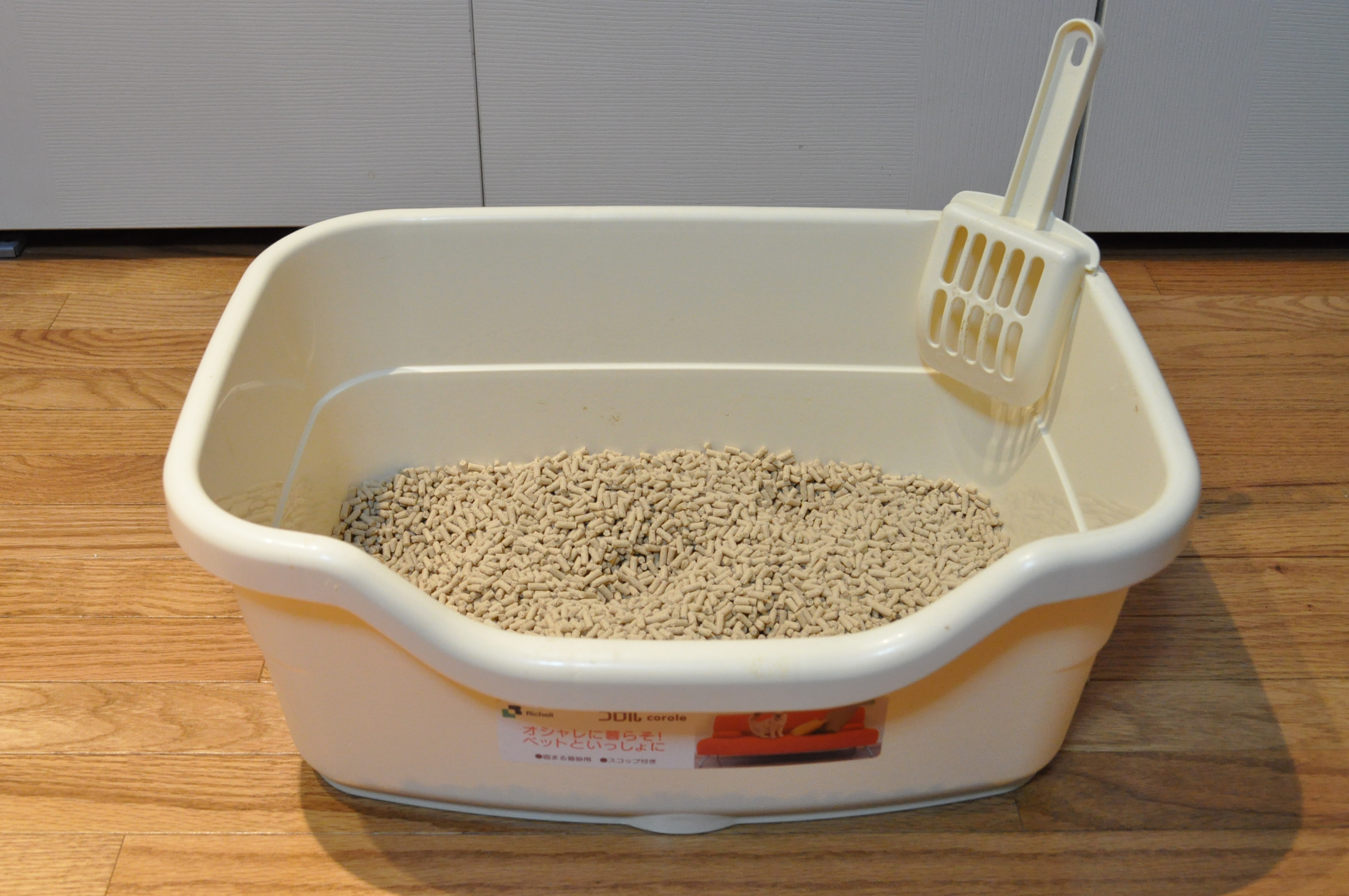
A basic litter box and scoop

A litter box, also known as a sandbox, cat box, litter tray, cat pan, potty, pot, or litter pan, is an indoor faeces and urine collection box for cats, as well as rabbits, ferrets, guinea pigs, hamsters, miniature pigs, small dogs, and other pets that instinctively or through training will make use of such a repository. They are provided for pets that are permitted free roam of a home but who cannot or do not always go outside to excrete their metabolic waste.

Cats tend to be fastidious by nature. Free-roaming domestic cats will attempt to cover their urine and especially their faeces within their home range, in proximity of their food area. (Note: In Feldman's study, only 25% of faeces and 36% of urine deposits were made within 10 m of the food area. Most faeces and less than a half of urine deposits made within the total study area of 1,600 m^{2} were partially buried. In Panaman's study, faeces were distributed evenly between inside and outside of each cat's core area, and half of them were left unburied, with "a significant tendency to leave more faeces exposed outside the core area". Only one in 33 observed urine deposits was scratched over. However, in this study the outer limit of the core area could lie as far as 80 or 400 m from the feeding place, and the intersection between cat core areas alone extended over 2,000 m^{2}.) To achieve this, they rake the surface in a backward sweeping motion with their front paws to draw loose material over the waste. The efficiency of these attempts is limited by soil texture, as cats have to break the surface with their toes due to their claws being protractile. Still, on rare occasions outdoor cats have been observed trying to dig holes to deposit their excrements in. The raking behaviour is associated with sniffing the waste and will often follow from it. (Note: Feldman reports that 98% of faeces were sniffed and for most an attempt to bury them was made. Beaver makes the causal link stronger by writing, "The earth raking associated with burying faeces is initiated by the odor of fecal matter", while citing Panaman, but the claim is not present in the source.) Raking is said to occur rarely when the motivation behind elimination is to engage in scent marking. (Note: Feldman notes that the only two faeces in her study left completely exposed were by adult male cats. Wendland wrongly attributes an unevidenced claim that "domestic cats bury their excrements because they view their owner as dominant" to Molteno et al. These researchers, who studied wild felids, note the possible communicatory role of faeces deposited in prominent locations, left exposed, and even emphasised by scraping the soil, which they write "needs further investigation".) At thirty days of age, domestic kittens start to exhibit the innate behaviour of raking loose sand or soft dirt. This initially occurs in advance of elimination and can be combined with ingesting particles.

Cat litter boxes are designed to stimulate feline instincts around waste elimination and provide a cat with loose material that is easy to rake over the waste. A litter box's bottom is typically filled with 2 inches (5 cm) or less of cat litter. Litter box filler is a loose, granular material that absorbs moisture and odors such as ammonia. Some litter brands contain baking soda to absorb such odors, or owners may sprinkle a thin layer in the bottom of the box, under the cat litter. The litter material also satisfies a cat's instinctive desire to hide their scent by allowing them to bury their waste. The most common material is clay, although recycled paper "pellets" and silica-based "crystal" variants are also used. Sometimes, when an owner wishes to stimulate the cat's natural instincts, natural dirt is used.

The litter can give off a strong odor, and must be disposed of periodically. It is recommended that the litter box be kept in low traffic areas of the home to avoid litter box aversion. There are commercially available special types of litter to help cover or lessen the odor produced. They contain baking soda, plant extracts and/or odorized crystals. If kept in a room with an intake vent, an air freshener may be added on the furnace filter to isolate the odor from the rest of the house.

== Types of litter box filler ==
Edward Lowe accidentally discovered that clay made an excellent cat litter material and began selling it in bags as "Kitty Litter" in 1947. In the US, cat litter is a $2-billion industry consuming five billion pounds (2.3 Mt) of mined clay annually.

=== Non-clumping conventional litter ===
Ed Lowe's discovery of Kitty Litter was the first large-scale use of clay (in the form of Fuller's earth) in litter boxes; previously sand was used. Clay litter is much more absorbent than sand and is manufactured into large grains or clumps of clay, making it less likely to be tracked from the litter box. The brand name Kitty Litter has become a genericized trademark, used by many to denote any type of cat litter. Today, cat litter can be obtained at a variety of retail stores. Non-clumping cat litter is often made of zeolite, diatomite and sepiolite.

=== Clumping litter ===
==== Clay ====
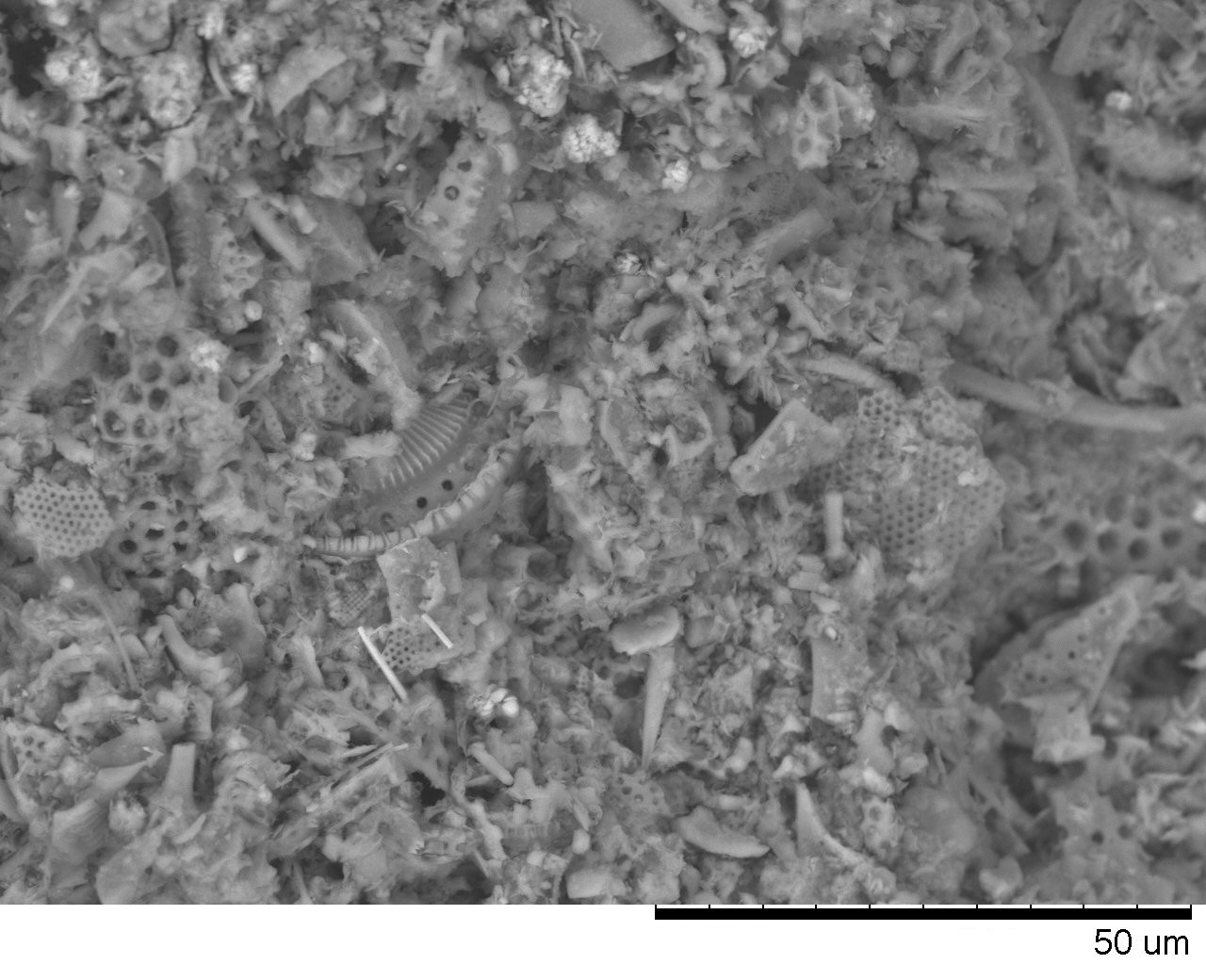
Microscopic close-up of clumping cat litter, showing the fossilized remains of diatoms

Litter clumps were first developed by using calcium bentonite clay. This was manufactured in the UK in the 1950s by the Fuller's Earth Union (FEU), which later became a part of Laporte Industries Ltd. Subsequently in America, clumping bentonite was developed in 1984 by biochemist Thomas Nelson. Most are made from granulated bentonite clay, which clumps together when wet and forms a solid mass separate from the other litter in the box. This solid clumped material can be scooped out and disposed of without changing the entire contents of the litter box.

Clumping litter usually also contains quartz or diatomaceous earth (sometimes called diatomaceous silica, which causes it to be mistakenly confused with silica gel litter). Because of the clumping effect, the manufacturers usually instruct not to flush clumping litters down the toilet, because it could clog it.

Clumping clay cat litters are natural products. Some may also contain naturally occurring crystalline silica, or silica dust, which in California is treated as a known carcinogen under Proposition 65. Clay litter is also criticized by the manufacturers of non-clay litter because the components of clay litter are commonly obtained from a strip mine in an environmentally degrading process.

This sort of litter can be toxic to ferrets, leading to both respiratory and digestive problems.

==== Non-clay ====
Minerals Technologies offers a clumping cat litter in the form of crystals made of "compacted baking soda", which in contrast to bentonite is either dust-free or low-dust, and allegedly "100% CO_{2} neutral".

=== Biodegradable litter ===
Biodegradable litters are made from various plant resources, including pine wood pellets, recycled newspaper, clumping sawdust, Brazilian cassava, pea husk, corn, wheat, walnuts, barley, soy pulp, and dried orange peels.

Each year, more than two million tons of cat litter ends up in landfills in the US alone. Primarily, this is not biodegradable or renewable and adds to the waste burden. Some pet owners prefer biodegradable litters due to its friendliness to the environment. Biodegradable cat litter can also be eliminated completely by safely composting the used litter at home. Other cat owners can be attracted to the biodegradable litters because of their flushability or deodorizing properties. Some pets, such as those with asthma or sensitive senses of smell, may also benefit from the reduced dust in some forms of biodegradable litter.

Biodegradable litter packaged for cats tends to be more expensive than traditional clay litters, so cost is often not a positive factor in their selection. Most biodegradable litters last longer than the equivalent clay or clumping clay litters. Grain-based animal or poultry feed also provides an economical alternative to products marketed specifically as cat litter. Additionally, most of these forms of litter are recycled from human usage and are thus reusing a waste product as opposed to drawing clay from mines.

Guar gum was the principal clumping agent used in biodegradable cat litter as of 2013, with a clumping rate of 69.8%, while xanthan gum (73.9%) and plantago gum (57.5%) were identified in one study as potential alternatives. It is also added to bentonite litter to increase its clumping capacity. In 2020, it was still being used in tests of new wood-based biodegradable litter formulations.

=== Silica gel litter ===
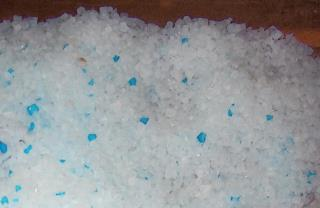
Silica "crystal" litter

Silica gel litter, often referred to as "crystal litter", is a porous granular form of silicon dioxide, has the highest absorbency of any litter, and has excellent moisture control and complete odor elimination for an extended period of time compared to other litters. It is typically prepared through a sol-gel process, which involves the hydrolysis and condensation of silica precursors such as tetraethylorthosilicate (TEOS) or sodium silicate (Na_{2}SiO_{3}). The porous structure of silica gel enables it to trap moisture within its network of interconnected pores, effectively locking away urine and preventing it from spreading or leaking. Moreover, many silica gel litter formulations incorporate activated carbon or other odor-neutralizing compounds, which further enhance the litter's ability to control unpleasant smells. In addition to its physical structure, the chemical composition of silica gel also contributes to its performance as a cat litter. The surface of silica gel is covered with silanol (Si-OH) and siloxane (Si-O-Si) functional groups. These groups interact with water molecules through hydrogen bonding and dipole-dipole interactions, enabling the material to absorb and retain moisture effectively.

Some owners praise its absorbency because 4–5 pounds (1.8–2.3 kg) can absorb liquid and odor for up to 30 days for one healthy normal weight cat. It is important to lightly stir the crystals daily while scooping the solid waste, otherwise urine can pool in the box. When crystal litter is saturated, at the end of 30 days or so, it begins to smell and is visibly saturated (the white crystals have turned slightly yellow). In comparison, over the same time period it may take 20–30 lb (9.1–13.6 kg) or more of clay or clumping litter, because it is necessary to replenish the litter that is removed when the clumped urine is scooped out. No replenishing is necessary with silica gel (crystal) litter.

== Types ==
=== Open litter pans ===
An open litter pan is generally the most basic and least expensive design. They are commonly constructed out of plastic, however some disposable models exist, in the shape of a rectangular tray with outwardly sloped sides 3.9 to 5.9 inches (10 to 15 centimeters) high. Open litter pans allow for maximum ventilation which may increase cat comfort. They show the waste most visibly which cat experts like Jackson Galaxy point out helps cat carers monitor current health status.

Litter pans with low walls are not ideal for containing litter when a pet scratches or digs. Some animals may urinate or defecate over the walls. Some designs include a detachable rim to help catch litter when the animal kicks to bury their waste.

=== Enclosed litter boxes ===
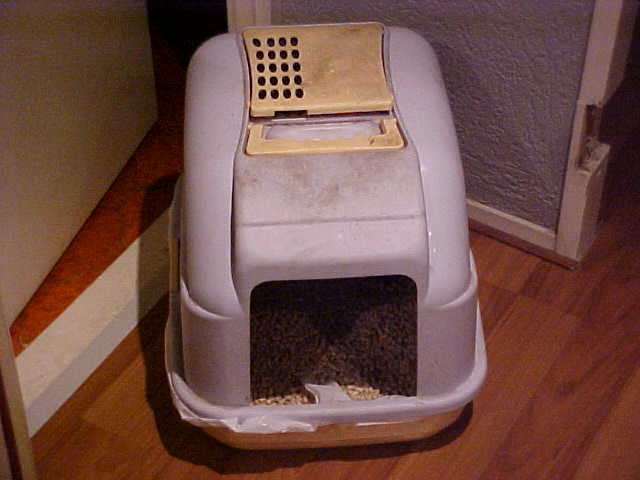
An enclosed litter box

A variety of enclosed litter boxes exist that include both the tray and hood. Many are constructed out of plastic and feature a plastic hood or dome that covers the litter pan and litter. The pet enters through an opening in the cover, these may be open or have a swinging door. To clean, pet owners lift the cover off the tray to scoop and change the litter. Covered litter boxes may help reduce the amount of litter that is tracked outside the box, may help address issues of pets eliminating waste over the walls of a litter pan, and may help contain odor. However, it can allow odors to build up which will affect the cat's comfort. While it offers privacy, it may be too confining for the cat. In the wild, cats do not prefer covered locations for toilet use.

=== Top-entry litter boxes ===
Top entry litter boxes have an opening on the top of the box and require the pet to climb on top of the box and into a hole to eliminate waste. While cats in good physical health, even kittens, have no problems accessing these boxes, they are generally not recommended for geriatric or physically limited felines. However, top-entry designs do have the added benefit of deterring other pets or young children from the contents of the litter box. Some designs feature a grate on top which allows litter from a cat's paws to fall back into the box, reducing litter tracking.

=== Self-cleaning litter boxes ===
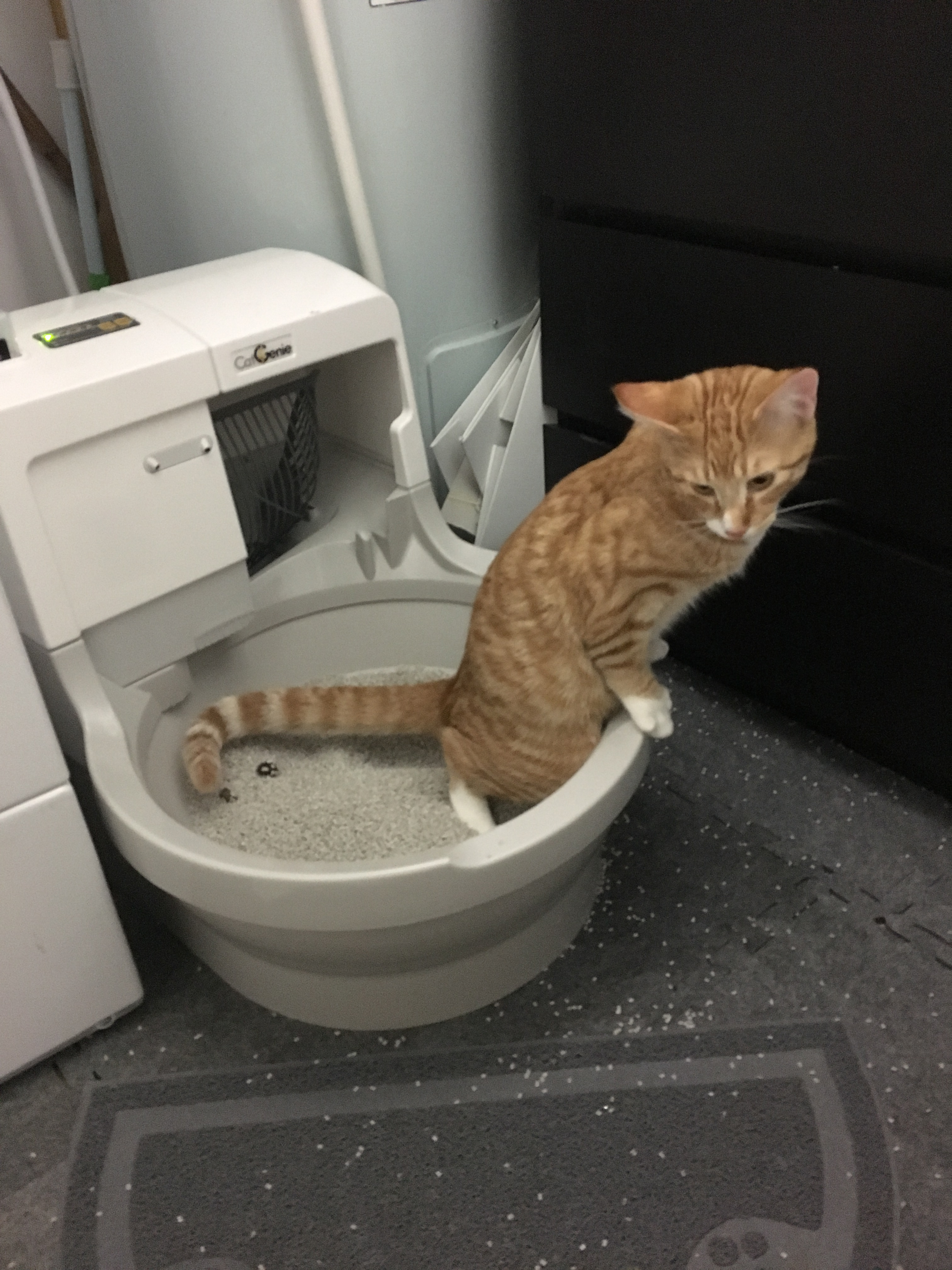
A cat using an automated fully-plumbed self cleaning litterbox with reusable plastic granules, which has a cleaning cycle that includes: automated scooping, waste flushing to laundry drain, cold water granule wash, deodorization, followed by a heated drying of the litter granules.

Self-cleaning litter boxes employ technology that automates the litter box emptying procedure. Some models have electric combing mechanisms that automatically scoop the clumps out of the litter box into a sealed, disposable-bag-lined container after the animal has used it. These models use a pressure pad or an infrared light to determine when the cat has left the box and will comb the box after a pre-determined amount of time has passed to avoid disturbing the cat. Self-cleaning litter boxes employ technology that automates the litter box emptying procedure. Automatic litter boxes are designed to handle the mess for you, offering convenience and cleanliness and making life much easier for cat owners.

Other designs take this one step further by connecting directly to a home's plumbing (faucet connection and drain) so they can wash, rinse and dry the permanent litter pellets automatically. Simpler designs exist as well; for example, some require the owner to manually shake the clumps into an easy-to-remove tray. Another variant has an enclosed sphere which rotates as it sifts out the clumps and deposits them in a drawer below the sphere. A new method involves incorporating sifting functionality within a sifting litter liner. Some automated litter boxes incorporate the use of a two-belt system. The top belt has litter ready to use while the lower belt has a batch of litter ready "on hold" for when the cleaning process takes place. As the litter on the bottom belt is moved up to the top, is it evenly distributed across the width of the top belt.

=== Disposable litter boxes ===
Disposable litter boxes are designed to free cat carers from inconveniences of dealing with animal waste besides just throwing the entire box away. Some may come with an included bag of litter. They are also marketed for use inside of pet crates or carriers to eliminate accidents.

=== Litter box furniture and cabinets ===
To hide a litter pan in plain sight, litter box furniture is designed to open and fit litter pans inside. Cats can access through a front, side, or top entrance. These cabinets are constructed of wood or wood composite and offered in different colors and styles, from traditional to contemporary. Features can include storage drawers, odor filters, wall liners, and external litter catches. While prices can vary from moderate to expensive, litter box furniture can help hide litter pans as well as contain odors.

== Alternatives ==
Instead of using a litter box, it is possible to train cats and dogs to use a toilet. Doing so significantly reduces waste, but for cats it goes against their instinct of burying waste. Combined with the requirement of jumping up onto the toilet, cats may find using a toilet stressful. In addition, excrement-based symptoms of medical problems are less likely to be spotted. There is also a higher likelihood of conflict with human use of toilets.

Another option for animals to relieve themselves indoors is to use an absorbent potty pad, also known as a puppy pad.

The final option is to train a cat or dog to relieve themselves outside. Given a yard or outside area, a cat can be easily trained to go outside. This aligns with a cat's natural instincts, but for a dog it may be more challenging.

== See also ==
- Animal latrine
- Cat intelligence
- Gravel
- Litter boxes in schools hoax
- Sandpit
- Silicosis

== Bibliography ==
- Beaver, Bonnie V. (2003), Feline Behavior (2nd ed.), St Louis, MO: Saunders, ISBN 0-7216-9498-5
- Feldman, Hilary N. (1994), "Methods of scent marking in the domestic cat" (PDF), Canadian Journal of Zoology, 72 (6): 1093–1099, Bibcode:1994CaJZ...72.1093F, doi:10.1139/z94-147
- Molteno, A.J.; Sliwa, Alexander; Richardson, P.R.K. (1998), "The role of scent marking in a free-ranging, female black-footed cat (Felis nigripes)" (PDF), Journal of Zoology, 245: 35–41, doi:10.1111/j.1469-7998.1998.tb00069.x
- Panaman, Roger (1981), "Behaviour and Ecology of Free-ranging Female Farm Cats (Felis catus L.)", Zeitschrift für Tierpsychologie, 56 (1): 59–73, Bibcode:1981Ethol..56...59P, doi:10.1111/j.1439-0310.1981.tb01284.x
- Vaughn, Steven F.; Kenar, James A.; Felker, Frederick C.; Berhow, Mark A.; Cermak, Steven C.; Evangelista, Roque L.; Fanta, George F.; Behle, Robert W.; Lee, Edward (2013), "Evaluation of alternatives to guar gum as tackifiers for hydromulch and as clumping agents for biodegradable cat litter", Industrial Crops & Products, 43: 798–801, doi:10.1016/j.indcrop.2012.09.002
- Vaughn, Steven F.; Winkler-Moser, Jill K.; Berhow, Mark A.; Byars, Jeffrey A.; Liu, Sean X.; Jackson, Michael A.; Peterson, Steven C.; Eller, Fred J. (2020), "An odor-reducing, low dust-forming, clumping cat litter produced from Eastern red cedar (Juniperus virginiana L.) wood fibers and biochar", Industrial Crops & Products, 147 112224: 1–5, doi:10.1016/j.indcrop.2020.112224
- Wendland, Tiffany Anne (2011), Development of Novel Cat Litter from Olive Oil Waste Products (PDF), Master's thesis: Massey University
