= General Low =

General Low may refer to:

- Alexander Low (British Army officer) (1817–1904), British Army general
- John Low (East India Company officer) (1788–1880), British Indian Army general, father of General Robert Low
- Robert Low (Indian Army officer) (1838–1911), British Indian Army general

== See also ==
- General Lowe (disambiguation)
- Sigismund von Löw (1757−1846), British Hanoverian general
