= Chris Lowe (disambiguation) =

Chris Lowe (born 1959) is an English musician.

Chris or Christopher Lowe may also refer to:

- Chris Lowe (basketball) (born 1987), American college basketball player and coach
- Chris Lowe (biotechnologist), British professor
- Chris Lowe (journalist) (born 1949), British news presenter
- Chris Löwe (born 1989), German footballer
- Christopher Lowe, who died in police custody in Fort Worth, Texas in 2018; see I can't breathe § Christopher Lowe

== See also ==
- Lowe (surname)
