= Sam Lowe =

English cricketer

Sam Lowe (19 July 1867 – 29 March 1947) was an English cricketer. He was a right-handed batsman and a right-arm fast-bowler. He was born and died in Kirkby-in-Ashfield.

Lowe made one first-class appearance for Nottinghamshire during the 1894 season, and played Minor Counties cricket for Glamorgan between 1896 and 1902. Lowe's input to the first-class game was minimal, scoring eight runs in the first innings and a duck in the second innings of his only first-class match.

Sam's brothers, Richard and Tom, also had brief first-class careers.
