= Stephen Low =

Stephen Low may refer to:

- Stephen Low (diplomat) (1927–2010), American diplomat
- Stephen Low (filmmaker) (born 1950), Canadian film director and screenwriter

== See also ==
- Stephen Lowe (disambiguation)
