= Mary Low =

Mary Low may refer to:

- Mary Caffrey Low (1850–1926), American librarian and educator
- Mary Fairchild MacMonnies Low (1858–1946), American painter
- Mary Stanley Low (1912–2007) - British-Cuban political activist, Trotskyist, surrealist poet, artist and Latin teacher

== See also ==
- Mary Lowe (disambiguation)
