= Charles Lowe =

Charles Lowe may refer to:

- Charles Lowe (cricketer) (1890–1953), English cricketer
- Charles Herbert Lowe (1920–2002), American herpetologist
- Charles P. Lowe (fl. 1883–1905), American xylophone player
- Charles Upton Lowe (1921–2012), physician, discoverer of oculocerebrorenal syndrome
- Charles Lowe (judge) (1880–1969), longest-serving judge on the Supreme Court of Victoria
- Charlie Lowe, American baseball player in 1872
- Chad Lowe (born 1968), American actor and director Charles Lowe

== See also ==
- Charles Lowell (disambiguation)
