= Ed Lowe (businessman) =

American businessman, inventor of cat litter

Edward Lowe (holding cat)

Edward Lowe (July 10, 1920 – October 4, 1995) was an American businessman and entrepreneur, noted for the invention of cat litter. The Small Business School described him as "building a huge business from nothing", and cites him as a textbook example of an individual who "created a product, brought it to marketplace, invented an industry and sold his business for millions". By the time of his death, his company was worth about 500 million dollars (or $1.06 billion today, adjusted for inflation).

== Background ==
Edward Lowe was born on July 10, 1920, in Saint Paul, Minnesota, to Lulu and Henry E. Lowe. His family moved to Cassopolis, Michigan, where he attended high school at Cassopolis High School. He had four children and six grandchildren. He served in the US Navy in World War II.

== Invention of cat litter ==
Before Lowe's invention, people kept their cats outside, using ashes, dirt or sand as cat litter when it was necessary to keep them inside. One day in January 1947, Mrs. Draper, Edward Lowe's neighbor in Cassopolis, Michigan, asked him for some sand to use as cat litter. Her sand pile was frozen so she had been using ashes but they tracked all over her house. Lowe worked for his father's company which sold bulk shipments of sand, sawdust and clay to heavy industries for use as absorbents. His father had recently received a sample shipment of a new clay product that he didn't want to switch to so it was just stored in a garage. Instead of sand, Lowe gave her some of that clay called fuller's earth, a set of clay minerals capable of absorbing their weight in water. She found it worked far better than sand or ashes. In later years he worked on developing a litter product for chimpanzee waste with Jane Goodall, but was unable to develop a successful product.

== Career ==
In 1947, Lowe decided to sell the clay. He packaged it in five-pound (2.3 kg) bags and called it "Kitty Litter". He suggested that a local pet store sell it for 65 cents (or $9.37 today). The store owner refused, saying that it would not sell because sand was so much cheaper. Lowe told him to give it away free until people were willing to pay for it. Kitty Litter was a success. Lowe drove around the country selling Kitty Litter. He even cleaned boxes at cat shows so he could get a booth to demonstrate his product. He founded Edward Lowe Industries and created Tidy Cat cat box filler in 1954. In the early 1980s, he almost lost his market to Clorox, but by 1990, Edward Lowe Industries was the top producer of cat box filler.

In Lowe's later years, he decided the best way for his business to continue after his death was to hand the running over to a management team funded by venture capitalists from New York and Chicago. The sale went through in 1990, with the company being renamed the Golden Cat Corporation; Lowe remained as an equity holder and director. The sale was later estimated by The New York Times as being $200 million (or $493 million today). Following his death, Golden Cat Corporation was sold to Ralston Purina.
