= Ming C. Lowe =

American painter

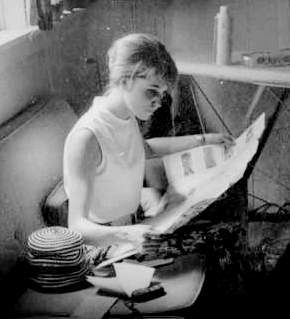
- Born: October 13, 1945 (age 80); Washington, D.C.
- Known for: Painting, Photography

Ming C. Lowe (born 1945) is an American painter of large-scale contemporary works on canvas and a fine art photographer.

Her work has reportedly served as a source of inspiration to artists such as Eric Burdon of the Animals, Paul Butterfield, Sterling Morrison of the Velvet Underground, Jesse Ed Davis, and James Gurley of Big Brother and the Holding Company.

== Biography ==
Lowe was born in Washington, D.C. Her mother, Choral Lowe, reportedly named her Ming due to her love of Ming dynasty era art.

Lowe's grandfather, a businessman, owned homes in Salt Lake City, Utah, and the beach town of La Jolla, California. Lowe grew up in both cities.

Lowe's parents divorced when she was 12, and Lowe later lived with her grandparents in Salt Lake City. She left high school during her junior year.

Lowe returned to La Jolla in 1961 and became involved in the youth counterculture. She rented a studio apartment in Pacific Beach and worked at the first Hobie Surfboard Shop in San Diego County. Lowe, who answered their fan mail, also participated in the surfer group, the Mac Meda Destruction Company founded by Jack Macpherson.

Lowe became pregnant at the age of 17 and moved to Palm Desert, where her mother and stepfather were publishing Desert Magazine. Lowe and her partner married, but later divorced in 1966 after having two daughters, Sloane and Portia Perry. Lowe retained her married name, Ming Perry, and remained a part of the La Jolla scene while raising her daughters as a single parent.

In 1967, Lowe bought a house in Palm Desert.

== Career ==
At the age of 29, Lowe had her first art show at a gallery in Palm Desert. She had her first painting show in 1978 in Long Beach, California, followed by many Palm Springs-area exhibitions. Her international collectors included many of her famous friends.

Lowe built her own gallery on her Palm Desert property in the mid-1980s. Her gallery also hosted free screenings of surreal films by Luis Buñuel, attracting the likes of avant-garde composer Ernst Krenek and underground filmmaker Kenneth Anger.

Lowe later moved to the mountain community of Pinyon, where she reportedly designed her own house and furniture.

She was reportedly in the top floor of the Hotel Washington across from the White House when a terrorist-piloted jet crashed into the Pentagon on September 11, 2001. She was photographing the smoke from the crash when President Bush's helicopter landed on the White House lawn. Lowe later photographed restricted areas of Ground Zero. She then juxtaposed the photos with images of Muslim culture taken from her international travels for a show titled "Here and There 911."

In 2006, Lowe was commissioned to photograph the San Diego waterfront for the Port Authority's Art in Public Places program. The year-long project resulted in a 30-photograph essay, "Shift Change: The Working Waterfront," which was displayed at the Balboa Photography Museum.

Throughout her career, Lowe has taken portraits of several notable figures, including Eric Burdon, James Gurley, Daniel Lanois, Eagles of Death Metal, Noah Purifoy, Bob Seidemann, Kurt Shaw, Victoria Williams, and Ted Quinn.
