= Sean Lowe =

Sean Lowe may refer to:

- Sean Lowe (baseball) (born 1971), American baseball player
- Sean Lowe (television personality) (born 1983), American college football player, reality television star
