= George Lowe (New Zealand cricketer) =

New Zealand cricketer

Personal information
- Born: 1 June 1847; Wellington, New Zealand
- Died: 3 April 1922 (aged 74); Wellington, New Zealand
- Source: Cricinfo, 24 October 2020

George Lowe (1 June 1847 – 3 April 1922) was a New Zealand cricketer. He played in two first-class matches for Wellington from 1873 to 1875.
