= Governor Lowe =

Governor Lowe may refer to:

- Enoch Louis Lowe (1820–1892), 29th Governor of Maryland
- Hudson Lowe (1769–1844), Governor of St Helena from 1815 to 1821
- Philip Lowe (born 1961), Governor of the Reserve Bank of Australia from 2016 to 2023
- Ralph P. Lowe (1805–1883), 4th Governor of Iowa
- Richard Barrett Lowe (1902–1972), 3rd Governor of Guam and 42nd Governor of American Samoa

== See also ==
- Frederick Low (1828–1894), 9th Governor of California
