= George Lowe (cricketer, born 1878) =

English cricketer

George Emmanuel Lowe (12 January 1878 – 15 August 1932) was an English first-class cricketer, who played in one match for Yorkshire County Cricket Club in 1902.

Born in Guisborough, Yorkshire, England, Lowe was a wicket-keeper, who scored five not out in his only first-class innings. He also took one catch in his debut and only game.

Lowe (who was registered at birth as George Emmanuel Low), died in August 1932 in Middlesbrough, Yorkshire, aged 54.
