= Mary Lowe =

Mary Lowe may refer to:

- Mary Johnson Lowe (1924–1999), American judge
- Mary Lowe (Guernsey politician), representing the parish of Vale in the legislature from 1994 to 2020
- Mary Lowe Dickinson (1839–1914), American writer and activist
- Mary Lowe Good (1931–2019), née Lowe, American chemist

== See also ==
- Mary Low (disambiguation)
