= Jason Lowe =

Jason Lowe may refer to:

- Jason Lowe (footballer) (born 1991), English footballer
- Jason Lowe (darts player) (born 1972), English darts player
- Jason Lowe (politician) (born 1974), former member of the Oklahoma House of Representatives
