= Stephen Lowe =

Stephen Lowe may refer to:

- Stephen Lowe (bishop of Hulme) (1944-2026), English Anglican bishop
- Stephen Lowe (playwright) (born 1947), English playwright
- Stephen Lowe (born 1953), son and biographer of actor Arthur Lowe
- Stephen Lowe (bishop of Auckland) (born 1962), Roman Catholic bishop in New Zealand
- Stephen Lowe (cricketer) (born 1981), English cricketer
- Steve Lowe, a character on the soap opera EastEnders

== See also ==
- Stephen Low (disambiguation)
