= James Lowe =

James or Jim Low(e) may refer to:

== Sportsmen ==
- James Low (footballer, born 1894) (1894–1960), Scottish footballer who played for Hearts
- James Low (Scottish footballer), Scottish international (1891) who played for Cambuslang
- James Lowe (footballer), Scottish international (1887) who played for St Bernard's
- James Lowe (rower) (born 1956), Australian rower
- James Lowe (rugby union) (born 1992), New Zealand rugby union player who plays internationally for Ireland
- James Lowe (cricketer) (born 1982), English cricketer

== Others ==
- James Lowe (musician) (1943-2025), American singer with The Electric Prunes
- Jim Lowe (1923–2016), American singer-songwriter
- James Lowe (conductor) (born 1976), English conductor and violist
- James Lowe (inventor) (1798–1866), English inventor
- James Low (East India Company officer) (1791–1852), Scottish military officer and scholar of Siamese language and culture
- James B. Lowe, American actor
- James F. Low, United States Air Force officer
- William James Lowe, Canadian politician
