= Small Business School =

American educational television program

Small Business School was a weekly, half-hour television program that began airing in 1994, first in the United States on PBS-member stations, and then throughout the world via the Voice of America. The show traveled extensively throughout the United States and the rest of the world to engage with and interview founders of small businesses that had been operating for a minimum of ten years. These businesses were recognized by both their communities and industries for their contributions to making the world a better place. The series was syndicated by the PBS Adult Learning Satellite Service and broadcast to nearly every college and university across the USA.

The program was titled "Small Business Today" until 1995. Then, it was renamed to "Small Business 2000."

In the interviews conducted throughout the show, business owners discussed the inception of their business ideas, the initiation of their ventures, and the strategies employed to overcome the hurdles they encountered. Many even discussed their initial failures. Ultimately, the goal of the interviews was to provide insight and inspiration for all business owners.

Each episode featured a transcript, a case study guide, an overview, and a homepage to offer viewers a comprehensive platform for further study of each episode.

The show was on the air most actively between 1994 and 2008. It has since been included in re-runs on PBS and PEG stations around the country. Case study guides first prepared for the PBS Adult Learning Satellite Service feed were then made available to colleges and universities throughout the world by being included within 50 basic textbooks used in business schools. The selection of a business to profile was most often selected from among nominations within a local chamber of commerce or a national trade association. For over 50 seasons the show was sponsored by many large American companies and for one season by the U.S. Small Business Administration.

In December 1994, the television show put up its first website. The transcripts, case study guides and overview were all posted. By 1999, this online school for business owners began streaming video of key episodes. By 2006, each key point within most of the weekly episodes began streaming as short-burst, user-selected videos between one and five minutes long. There were over 1800 video clips on the site that addressed key issues that typical business owners face every day.
