= General Lowe =

General Lowe may refer to:

- Henry H. Lowe (1795–1854), American brigadier general of militia during the Creek War of 1836
- Hudson Lowe (1769–1844), British Army lieutenant-general best known as the jailer of Napoleon on Saint Helena
- William Lowe (British Army officer) (1861–1944), British Army major-general, commander of the British forces in Dublin during the Easter Rising of 1916

== See also ==
- General Low (disambiguation)
