= George W. Lowe =

American politician

George W. Lowe (c. 1847 - ?) was an American politician minister and served as a member of the Arkansas House of Representatives. He represented Monroe County, Arkansas and served in the 1889 and 1891 sessions.

Lowe was born in Hardeman County, Tennessee and was enslaved by Samuel A. Bunting, along with his mother Harriet until he was 15. In 1863 he became a soldier as chief musician and was discharged in 1866 when he returned home to Hardeman County.

He served as a minister in Holly Grove, Arkansas and was involved in emigration efforts in 1892. Emigration was seen as a way to escape discrimination.
