= Peter Lowe =

Peter Lowe may refer to:

- Peter Lowe (artist) (born 1938), British artist
- Peter Lowe (surgeon) (died 1610), Scottish surgeon
- Peter Lowe (cricketer) (1935–1988), English cricketer
