= George Lowe (cricketer, born 1915) =

English cricketer

Personal information
- Full name: George William Lowe
- Born: 25 May 1915; Mastin Moor, Derbyshire, England
- Died: 30 April 2008 (aged 92); Chesterfield, Derbyshire, England
- Batting: Right-handed

Domestic team information
- Years: Team
- 1949–1953: Derbyshire
- FC debut: 27 June 1949 Derbyshire v Kent
- Last FC: 19 August 1953 Derbyshire v Somerset

Career statistics
Competition	First-class
Matches	2
Runs scored	43
Batting average	14.33
100s/50s	0/0
Top score	43
Catches/stumpings	3/–
- Source: CricketArchive, January 2012

George William Lowe (25 May 1915 – 30 April 2008) was an English cricketer who played first-class cricket for Derbyshire in 1949 and 1953.

Lowe was born in the village of Mastin Moor, near Staveley, Derbyshire. He started playing for Derbyshire in the second XI in 1948.

He made his debut for the Derbyshire team in the 1949 season against Kent when he made 22 in his second innings. It was his only first team appearance in the year and he continued playing in the second XI until 1956.

He made one more first-class appearance in the 1953 season against Somerset, when he made 21 in the only innings he played.

Lowe was a right-handed batsman and played three innings in two first-class matches with an average of 14.33 and a top score of 22.
