= Charles Lowell =

Charles Lowell may refer to:

- Charles Lowell (minister) (1782–1861), Unitarian minister from Boston
- Charles Russell Lowell (1835–1864), Union cavalry general
- Charles W. Lowell (1834–1877), American lawyer, commanding officer of a "colored" unit of the Union Army, state legislator and postmaster
- Charlie Lowell (born 1973), pianist for rock group Jars of Clay
