= Senator Lowe =

Senator Lowe may refer to:

- David P. Lowe (1823–1882), Kansas State Senate
- Enos Lowe (1804–1880), Iowa State Senate
- J. Adam Lowe (born 1981), Tennessee State Senate
- John Lowe (Nebraska politician) (born 1959), Nebraska State Senate
- Paul A. Lowe Jr. (born 1959), North Carolina State Senate

== See also ==
- Henry R. Low (1826–1888), New York State Senate
