= Ed Lowe (journalist) =

American journalist

- Born: Edward J. Lowe; March 26, 1946; Brooklyn, New York, U.S.
- Died: January 15, 2011 (aged 64); Huntington, New York, U.S.
- Occupation: journalist
- Notable credit(s): Long Island Press and Neighbor Newspapers; Newsday

Edward J. Lowe Jr. (March 26, 1946 – January 15, 2011) was an American journalist who wrote columns for Newsday and The Long Island Press.

== Career ==
Lowe began his journalism career as a high school newspaper columnist at St. Pius X Preparatory Seminary in Uniondale, New York. He was editor of the newspaper at Marist College, from where he graduated in 1967.

Lowe initially worked as an English teacher at Lindenhurst Junior High School. After the birth of his daughter Colleen, his second child, Lowe became a daily reporter at the Suffolk Sun in August 1969. However, the paper folded soon after, and Lowe was hired by Newsday.

In 1976, Lowe became a featured columnist for Newsday, appearing three times a week. In the early 2000s, Lowe hosted a one-hour weekday morning talk show on AM 540 WLUX (now WBWD). In 2004, he accepted early retirement from Newsday and became a columnist for The Long Island Press and the Neighbor Newspapers group.

== Personal life and death ==
He had two sons, James (Jed) and Daniel, with his second wife Phyllis Singer, then an editor at "Newsday." Lowe also hosted a cable television program. He was known for his wit and ability to capture average people and their stories.

Lowe suffered a stroke in January 2008, and died of liver cancer on January 15, 2011. He was survived by his wife Susan Hennings-Lowe, daughters Theresa Christine "TC" Marino and Colleen Lowe Smith, and sons James "Jed" Lowe and Daniel Lowe.

== Bibliography ==
- Ed Lowe's Long Island.
- Not As I Do: A Father's Report.

== as co-author with Stanley Siegel ==
- The Patient Who Cured His Therapist.
- Uncharted Lives.
