= Tom Lowe (cricketer) =

English cricketer

Tom Lowe (25 July 1859 – 29 August 1934) was an English first-class cricketer active 1894 who played for Nottinghamshire. He was born and died in Kirkby-in-Ashfield.
