= William C. Lowe =

- Born: January 15, 1941; Easton, Pennsylvania
- Died: October 19, 2013 (aged 72); Lake Forest, Illinois
- Organization: IBM
- Spouse(s): Judy Lowe, Cristina Lowe (m. Aug 14, 1992)

William Cleland Lowe (January 15, 1941 – October 19, 2013) was an IBM Executive and is known as the "Father of the IBM PC".

== Early career ==
Lowe received a bachelor's degree in physics at Lafayette College in Pennsylvania in 1962 and joined IBM as a product test engineer. In 1975, he was named director of development and manufacturing operations for the General Systems Division in Atlanta, Georgia. In January 1977, he was appointed director of strategic development for GSD and, later that year, administrative assistant to the division's president. In January 1978, Lowe was named systems manager, Entry Level Systems Division, for GSD in Boca Raton, Florida, and in November, 1978, lab director for the site.

In March 1981, he was appointed a vice president of the Information Systems Division and general manager of the IBM's Rochester, Minnesota, facility. In 1982, he became vice president for the System Products Division in White Plains, New York and in 1983 was appointed assistant group executive for the Information Systems and Communications Group. Lowe returned to Entry Systems Division in March 1985 and served as ESD President through 1988. He was elected an IBM vice president in January 1986.

In 1973, while an executive in General Systems Division, Lowe was instrumental in fostering an engineering prototype called SCAMP (Special Computer APL Machine Portable) created by Dr. Paul Friedl and a team at the IBM Los Gatos Scientific Center. SCAMP has been dubbed in PC Magazine as "the world's first personal computer" and this seminal, single-user portable computer now resides in the Smithsonian Institution, Washington, D.C. A non-working industrial design model was also created in 1973 illustrating how the SCAMP engineering prototype could be transformed into a usable product design for the marketplace. The engineering prototype and design model were utilized internally by Lowe in his early efforts to demonstrate the viability of creating a single-user computer. Throughout the 1970s he continually demonstrated numerous single-user computer design concepts in an effort to convince IBM to enter the personal computer business. A selection of these early IBM industrial design concepts created in the infancy of personal computing is highlighted in the book DELETE: A Design History of Computer Vapourware.

== Role in the birth of the IBM PC ==
While the up-and-coming personal computer market potential had been studied and validated, Lowe determined IBM was unable to internally build a personal computer profitably and in a timely manner. When he spoke on the topic to the important Corporate Management Committee in July 1980, he said that to enter the market IBM needed to acquire another company "because we can't do this within the culture of IBM". The company Lowe suggested was Atari, Inc. and he had an IBM industrial design model created using their existing Atari 800 to demonstrate the concept.

However CEO Frank Carey had begun to encourage the creation of small, autonomous "Independent Business Units" (IBU) within IBM, so therefore, rather than acquiring Atari, the corporate committee allowed Lowe to form a group of 12 employees and requested a strategy for developing the product internally. The crude prototype they designed barely worked when Lowe demonstrated it to the committee in August, 1980, but he presented a detailed business plan that streamlined the development process by proposing an open architecture as well as non-proprietary components and software. Furthermore, the new PC product would be sold through retail stores. All these elements of Lowe's plan were contrary to IBM tradition.

Ultimately, the Corporate Management Committee gave approval to move forward, and in 1980 Lowe designated a multi-disciplinary team under manager Don Estridge to develop and launch the new product. In order to move quickly they designed it from standard components and outsourced development of the operating system to Microsoft and the processor to Intel. Following Lowe's strategy, the IBM PC was developed in one year. It was launched in August, 1981, and it sold far more than had been projected, thereby legitimizing the personal computer business.

== Later career and death ==
In 1988, after twenty five years with IBM, Lowe decided to retire and become EVP for Xerox where he continued to innovate with the launch of the Docutech. Lowe then in 1991 became Chief Executive Officer of Gulfstream Aerospace.

Lowe died of a heart attack in 2013.
