= Closed Area Permit =

Hong Kong travel document

Closed Area Permit 邊境禁區通行證
- An example of a Tourism Closed Area Permit for Sha Tau Kok from 2024 (Note: The QR code has been altered for privacy reasons.)

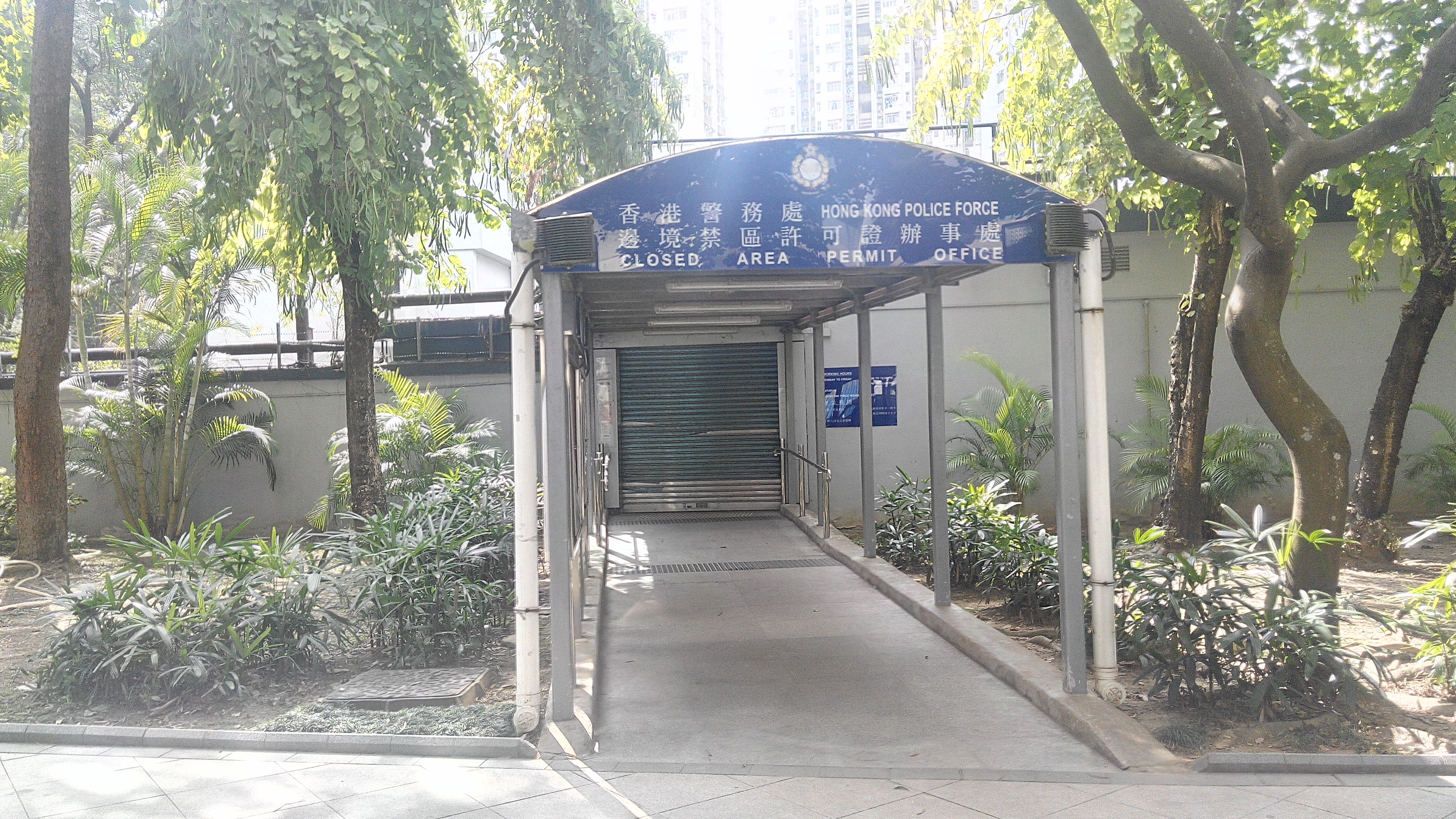
- The Closed Area Permit Office in Fanling
- Type: Travel permit
- Issued by: Hong Kong Police Force (HKPF)
- Purpose: To allow entry into the Frontier Closed Area of Hong Kong
- Eligibility: Anyone possessing a valid Hong Kong identity card or passport
- Expiration: Non-tourists: 1 to 5 years after issuance; Tourists: At 9 PM, on the date selected by the applicant
- Cost: Free
- Rights: Limited travel in the Frontier Closed Area depending on the category chosen by the applicant
- Website: Closed Area Permit portal on the HKPF website

A Closed Area Permit (CAP) (Note: traditional Chinese: 邊境禁區通行證; simplified Chinese: 边境禁区通行证; pinyin: biānjìng jìnqū tōngxíngzhèng; Jyutping: bin1 ging2 gam3 keoi1 tung1 hang4 zing3) is a document issued by the Hong Kong Police Force (HKPF) that allows individuals to travel in the Frontier Closed Area, a regulated border zone between Hong Kong and mainland China. Individuals may apply for a permit if they live, work, have relatives, or wish to travel in the Frontier Closed Area. Those wishing to travel in the Frontier Closed Area for tourism purposes are issued a Tourism Closed Area Permit, which is only valid for the date selected by the applicant for their visit. Other permits are valid for 1 to 5 years, depending on the applicant's reason for travel. For the purposes of the permit, the Frontier Closed Area is divided into four zones: Lok Ma Chau, Ta Kwu Ling, Sha Tau Kok, and Chung Ying Street. The travel of approved applicants is limited to the zone they applied to.

== Eligibility ==
Any individual who possesses a valid Hong Kong identity card or passport may apply for a Closed Area Permit, either in person at the Closed Area Permit Office in Fanling or online on the HKPF website. Residents, tourists, tour groups, corporations, media and government personnel may submit their applications online. Depending on their reason for travel (and thus category of permit chosen), applicants may be asked to provide additional supporting documents, such as a proof of residence or proof of relationship. Applicants wishing to drive a vehicle in the Frontier Closed Area require further documentation. Residents of the Frontier Closed Area below the age of 18 may freely travel in and out of their home area without a permit.

== Application ==
Individual applications can accommodate up to 12 people, while group applications allow up to 50 individuals and 3 vehicles per form. Tour guides and drivers in group applications must hold valid permits. Corporations may submit applications for up to 30 individuals and 20 vehicles per form, depending on the permit type. Media personnel must make particular arrangements, submit permits via the online portal, and follow separate processing timelines. Processing times range from 3 to 12 working days, depending on the category and zone (Lok Ma Chau, Ta Kwu Ling, Sha Tau Kok, or Chung Ying Street) selected by the applicant. All permits are issued free of charge, and approved applicants may download electronic permits.

The Commissioner of the HKPF oversees the issuance, withdrawal, and data management of Closed Area Permits. The commissioner reserves the right to share any personal data provided by applicants to other authorised departments. Rejected applicants may request a review of their application and escalate their case up to the District Commander for a final decision.

== Use ==
Tourism Closed Area Permits allow individuals and groups to enter the closed town of Sha Tau Kok (excluding Chung Ying Street), with visiting hours from 7 AM to 9 PM. Printed and electronic permits are both valid for inspections, but supporting documents, including the Hong Kong identity card or passport, must be presented physically.
