= Greater Yunnan =

Region centered around Yunnan, China

A depiction of Yunnan.

Greater Yunnan is an ill-defined term which refers to Yunnan, China. In the fifteenth century, the region encompassed parts of Northern Southeast Asia and Northeast India. Some scholars use the term not to describe a geographical region centering mainly around Yunnan, but rather to describe China's modern influence over most of Southeast Asia.

== See also ==
- China Rim
- East and Southeast Asian relations with Northeast India
- Golden Triangle (Southeast Asia)
