= Kong Ha =

Village in Hong Kong

Coordinates: 22.5475°N 114.2239°E

Kong Ha (Chinese: 崗下) is a village in Sha Tau Kok, Hong Kong.

== Administration ==
Kong Ha is a recognized village under the New Territories Small House Policy.

== History ==
At the time of the 1911 census, the population of Kong Ha was 135. The number of males was 63.

The three Hakka villages of Tam Shui Hang, Tong To and Shan Tsui had a total population of around 1,000 persons in 1961. During the Cultural Revolution, the villagers of these three places removed a Tin Hau image from a Man Mo temple located across the border in Mainland China and built a temple at the western end of Kong Ha Village to house the image. The temple was under the management of a special trust, the Sam Wo Tong (三和堂).

== Features ==
Kong Ha Village has been described as "containing numerous historic village houses that were built before 1950". The Tang Ancestral Hall is located in Kong Ha Village. Yuen Tuen Shan (元墩山), a hill adjacent to the village, features a feng shui woodland.

== See also ==
- Frontier Closed Area
