= Tam Shui Hang =

Village in Hong Kong

Coordinates: 22.546523°N 114.219245°E

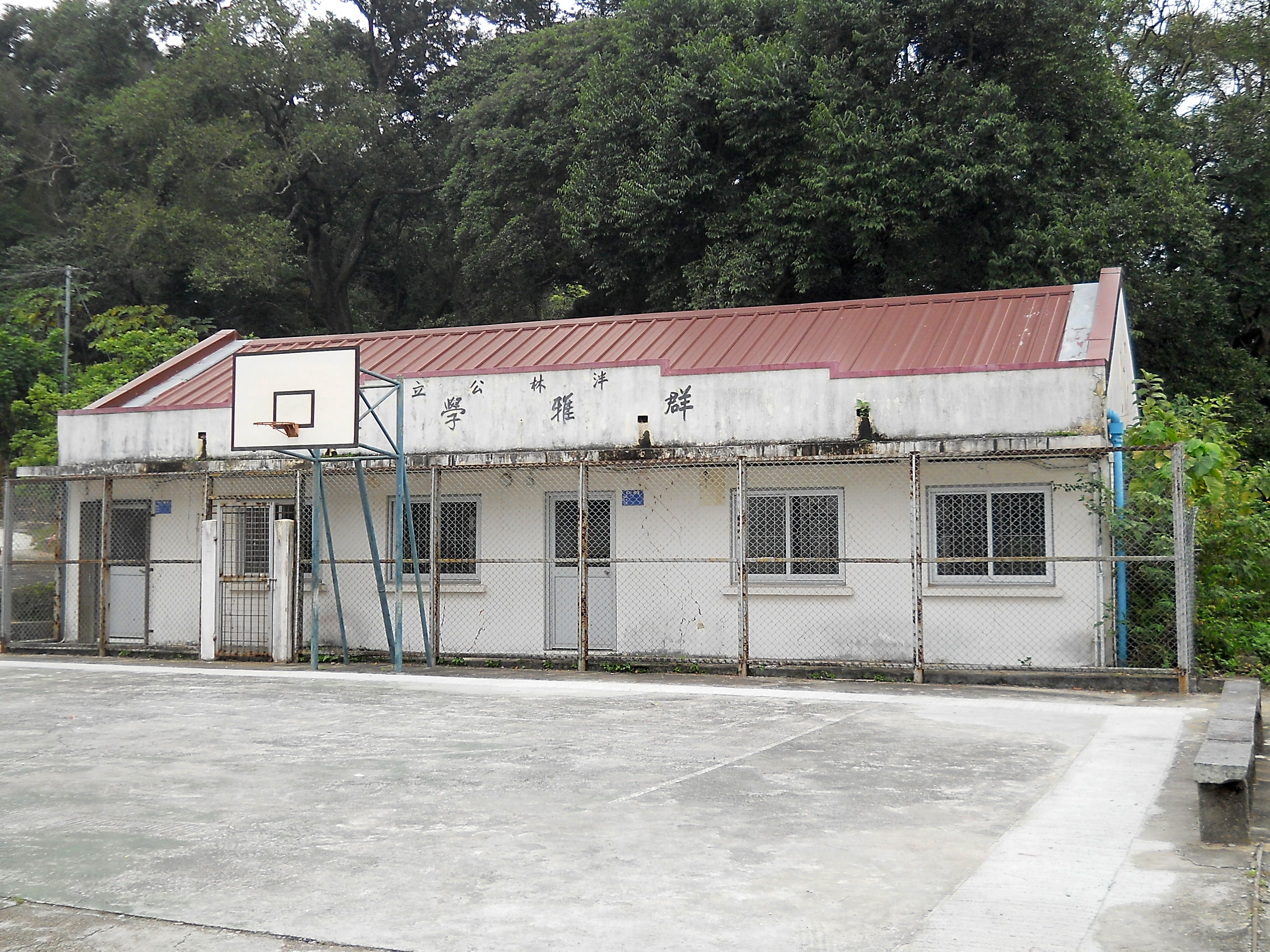
Former Kwan Ah School (泮林公立群雅學校) in Tam Shui Hang.

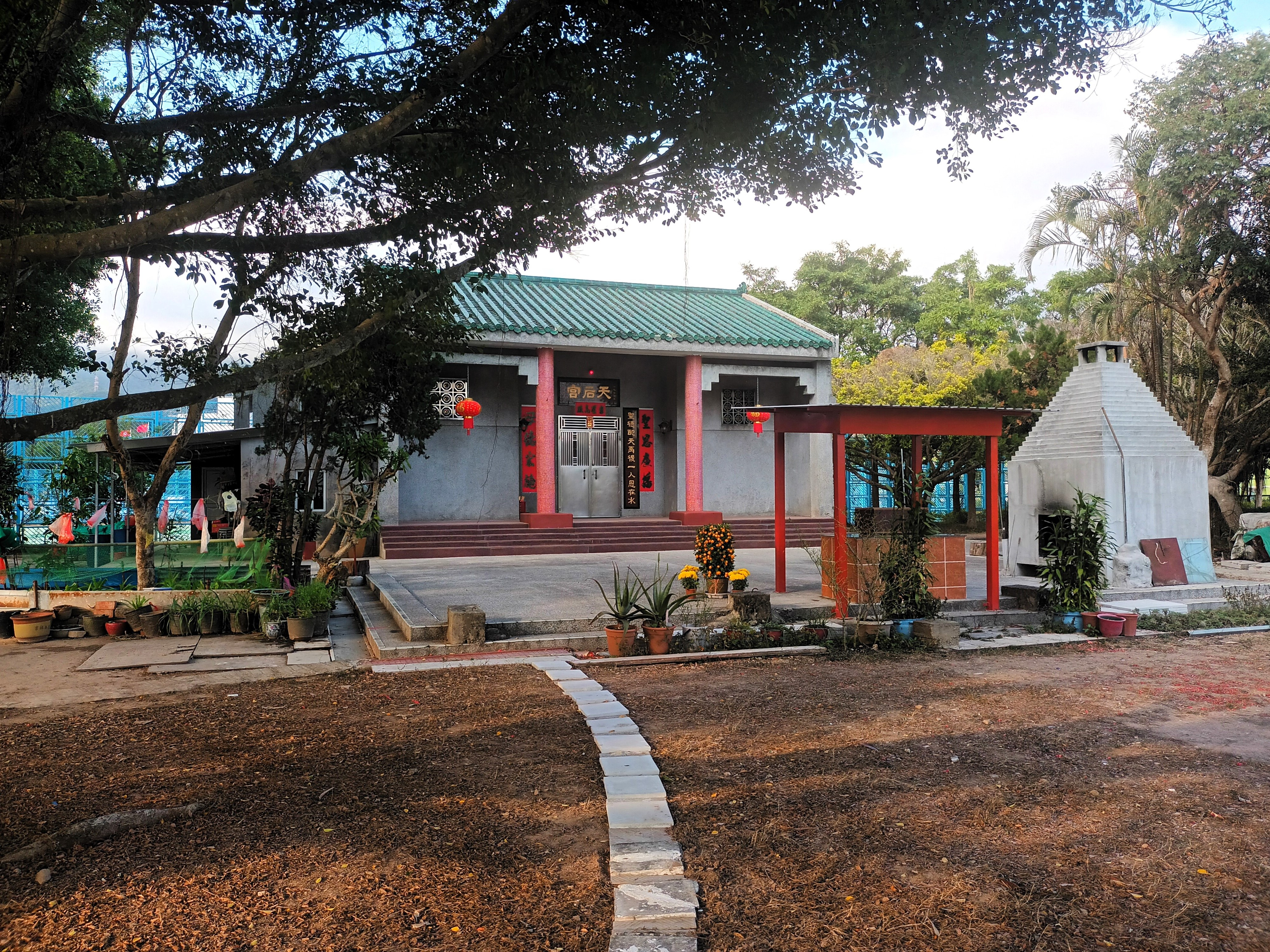
Tin Hau Temple south of Tam Shui Hang.

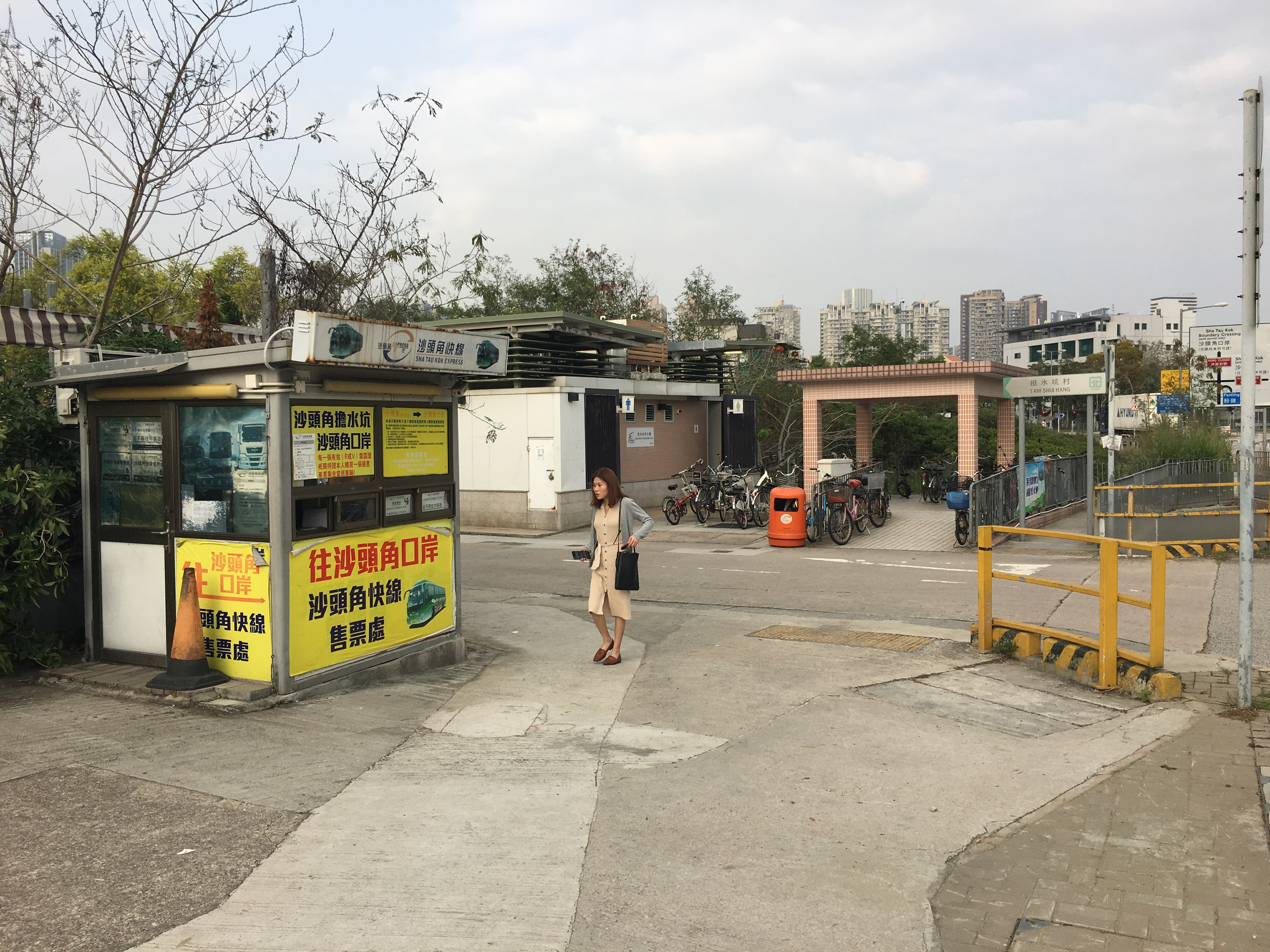
Sha Tau Kok Express ticket office in Tam Shui Hang.

Tam Shui Hang (Chinese: 担水坑) is a village in the Sha Tau Kok area of North District of Hong Kong. The village is divided into upper (Sheung Tam Shui Hang, 上担水坑), middle and lower (Ha Tam Shui Hang, 下担水坑) parts.

== Administration ==
Tam Shui Hang is a recognized village under the New Territories Small House Policy. It is one of the villages represented within the Sha Tau Kok District Rural Committee. For electoral purposes, Tam Shui Hang is part of the Sha Ta constituency, which is currently represented by Ko Wai-kei.

== History ==
The three Hakka villages of Tam Shui Hang, Tong To and Shan Tsui had a total population of around 1,000 persons in 1961. During the Cultural Revolution, the villagers of these three places removed a Tin Hau image from a Man Mo temple located across the border in Mainland China and built a temple in Tsoi Yuen Kok (菜園角), at the western end of Kong Ha Village to house the image. The temple was under the management of a special trust, the Sam Wo Tong (三和堂). In the 1990s, the residents constructed a new Tin Hau Temple at the present location, south of Tam Shui Hang, where the original statue of Tin Hau is enshrined.

== Features ==
The Kwan Ah School in Tam Shui Hang ceased operation in 2004.
