= Boundaries of Macau =

Regulated administrative border

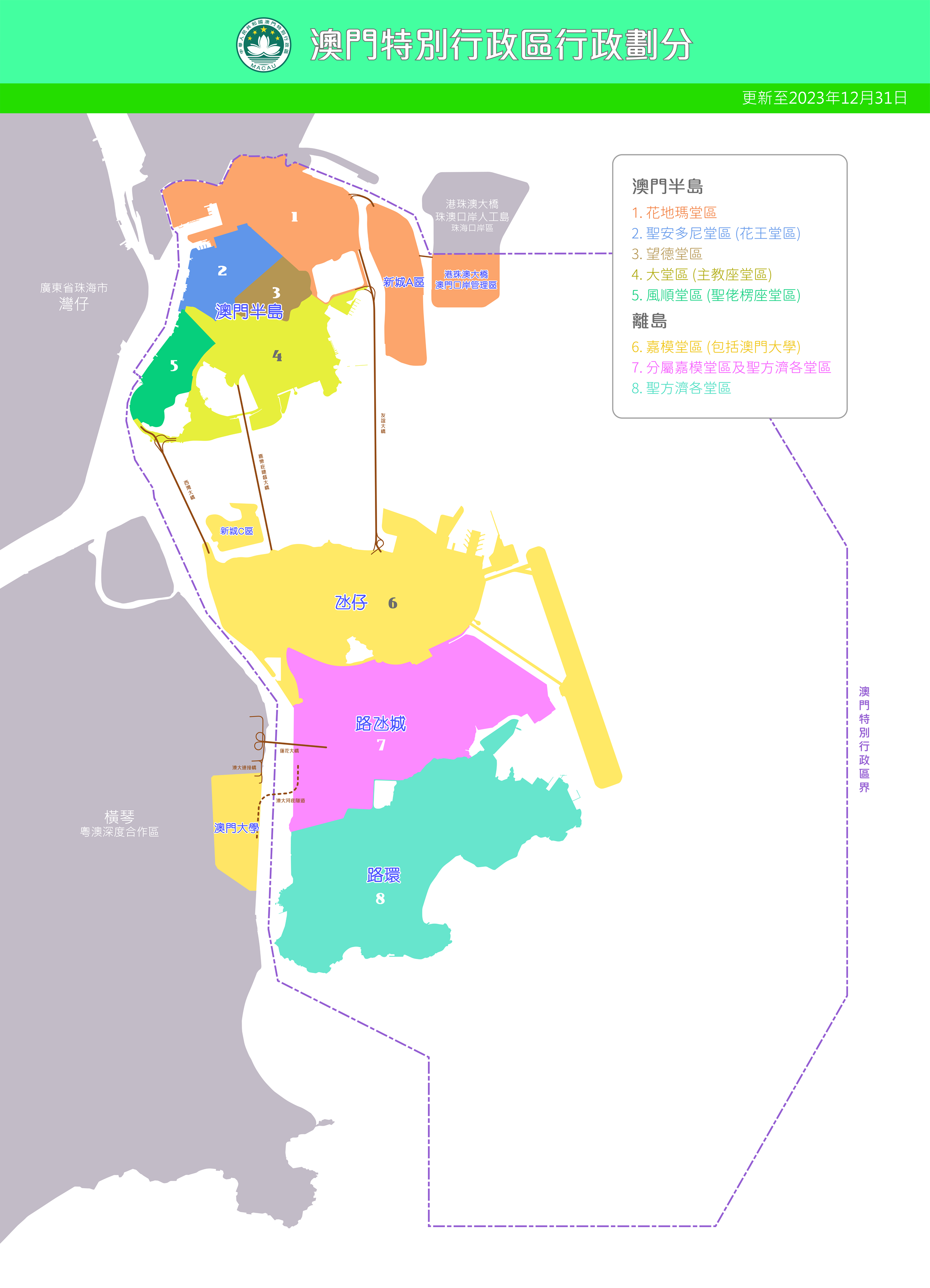
Map of the boundaries of Macau as of 2015, dotted in violet dash lines surrounding Macau.

The Boundaries of Macau, officially the Delimitation of the administrative division of the Macao Special Administrative Region of the People's Republic of China (Portuguese: Delimitação da divisão administrativa da Região Administrativa Especial de Macau da República Popular da China, Chinese: 中華人民共和國澳門特別行政區行政區域界線), is a regulated administrative border with border control controlled by the Public Security Police Force in force under the One country, two systems constitutional principle, which separates the Macau Special Administrative Region from mainland China, by land border fence of 0.34 km (0.21 mi) and maritime boundary of 85 km (53 mi), enforcing a separate immigration and customs-controlled jurisdiction from mainland China.

== Immigration control points ==
As of 2024, there were a total of 10 checkpoints or points or entry and exit in operation in Macau.

| No. | Macau Control Point | Parish | Type of border crossing and coordinates | Counterpart Mainland Chinese Port(s) | District and City in mainland China | Opened | Weblinks and Remarks |
|---|---|---|---|---|---|---|---|
| 1 | Portas do Cerco | Nossa Senhora de Fátima | Land border crossing 22°12′58″N 113°32′57″E | Gongbei Port (拱北口岸) | Gongbei Subdistrict, Zhuhai | 1993 | fsm.gov.mo |
| 2 | Posto de Migração de Qingmao | Nossa Senhora de Fátima | Land border crossing 22°12′46″N 113°32′30″E | Qingmao Port (青茂口岸) | Gongbei Subdistrict, Zhuhai | 2021 | fsm.gov.mo |
| 3 | Posto de Migração da Zona do Posto Fronteiriço da Parte de Macau do Posto Fronteiriço Hengqin | Nossa Senhora do Carmo | Land border crossing 22°08′26″N 113°32′31″E | Hengqin Port (横琴口岸) | Hengqin, Zhuhai | 2020 | fsm.gov.mo |
| 4 | Posto de Migração da Ponte Hong Kong-Zhuhai-Macau (港珠澳大橋澳門邊檢大樓) | Novos Aterros Urbanos de Macau, Nossa Senhora de Fátima | Border crossing the Hong Kong–Zhuhai–Macau Bridge; 22°12′05″N 113°34′29″E | Hong Kong-Zhuhai-Macao Bridge Zhuhai Highway Port (港珠澳大桥珠海公路口岸) | Gongbei Subdistrict, Zhuhai | 2018 | fsm.gov.mo (Macau) td.gov.hk (Hong Kong) |
| 4 | Posto de Migração da Ponte Hong Kong-Zhuhai-Macau (港珠澳大橋澳門邊檢大樓) | Novos Aterros Urbanos de Macau, Nossa Senhora de Fátima | Border crossing the Hong Kong–Zhuhai–Macau Bridge; 22°12′05″N 113°34′29″E | Hong Kong-Zhuhai-Macao Bridge Control Point (港珠澳大橋管制站) | Chek Lap Kok, Hong Kong | 2018 | fsm.gov.mo (Macau) td.gov.hk (Hong Kong) |
| 5 | Posto de Migração do Parque Industrial Transfronteiriço Zhuhai-Macau | Nossa Senhora de Fátima | Land border crossing 22.212143°N 113.533762°E | Maoshengwei Port 茂盛圍口岸 | Gongbei Subdistrict, Zhuhai | 2007 | fsm.gov.mo |
| 6 | Terminal Marítimo do Porto Exterior | Sé | Border crossing clearance in Macau for crossing Macau boundaries by sea 22°11′49″N 113°33′32″E | multiple | multiple | 1993 | fsm.gov.mo |
| 7 | Terminal Marítimo da Taipa | Nossa Senhora do Carmo | Border crossing clearance in Macau for crossing Macau boundaries by sea 22°09′45″N 113°34′40″E | multiple | multiple | 2007 | fsm.gov.mo |
| 8 | Aeroporto Internacional de Macau | Nossa Senhora do Carmo | Airport; 22°08′58″N 113°35′29″E | - | - | 1995 | fsm.gov.mo macau-airport.com |
| 9 | Terminal Marítimo do Porto Interior | Santo António | Border crossing clearance in Macau for crossing Macau boundaries by sea 22°11′41.2″N 113°32′7.2″E | multiple | multiple | 2008 | fsm.gov.mo |
| 10 | Marina de Coloane | São Francisco Xavier | Border crossing clearance in Macau for crossing Macau boundaries by sea 22°07′08″N 113°32′59″E | multiple | multiple | 2021 | fsm.gov.mo |

== See also ==
- Borders of China
- Boundaries of Hong Kong
