= Borders of China =

Political land boundaries between China and its neighbouring territories

People's Republic of China Territory claimed but not controlled

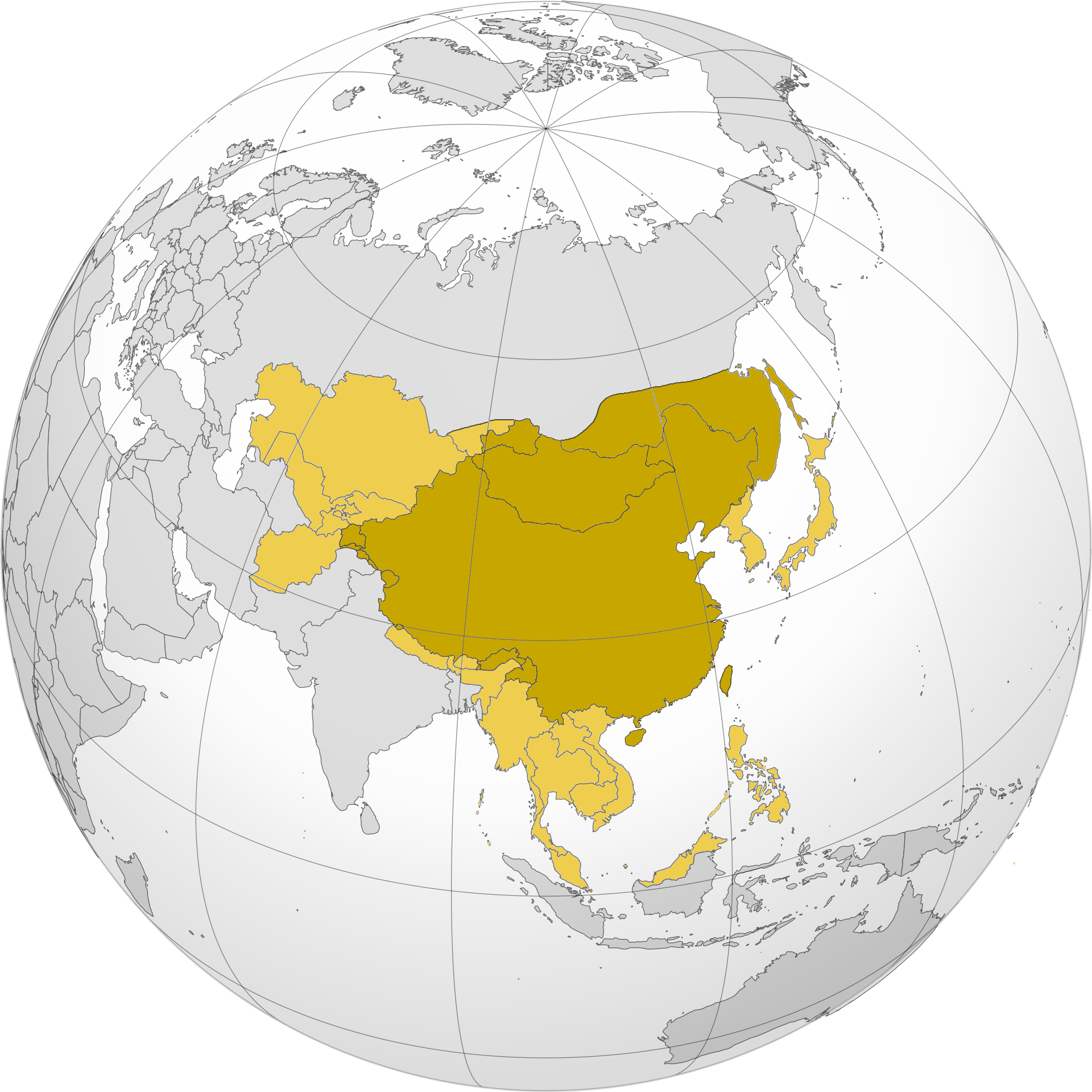
Historical China Former tributary states

The People's Republic of China (PRC) shares land borders with 14 countries (tied with Russia for the most in the world): North Korea, Russia, Mongolia, Kazakhstan, Kyrgyzstan, Tajikistan, Afghanistan, Pakistan, India, Nepal, Bhutan, Myanmar, Laos, and Vietnam, and with two Special administrative regions of China, Hong Kong and Macao. The land borders, counterclockwise from northeast to southwest, are the China–North Korea border, the eastern segment of the China–Russia border, the China–Mongolia border, the western segment of the China–Russia border, the China–Kazakhstan border, the China–Kyrgyzstan border, the China–Tajikistan border, the China–Afghanistan border, the China–Pakistan border, the western segment of the China–India border (the most contested of the Sino-Indian border dispute), the China–Nepal border, the central segment of the China–India border (Sikkim), the China–Bhutan border, the eastern segment of the China–India border, the China–Myanmar border, the China–Laos border, the China–Vietnam border, a 3-kilometre (1.9 mi) internal border with Macau, a Portuguese territory until 1999, and a 30-kilometre (19 mi) internal border with the special administrative region of Hong Kong, which was a British dependency before 1997.

To the west, China has maritime borders with South Korea, Japan, and contested limits with Taiwan and other countries in the South China Sea, among other territorial disputes.

At 22,457 kilometres (13,954 mi), China has the longest land borders of any country.

== Land border by polity ==
Below is a table of countries and territories that share a land border with China around its perimeter. In parentheses are their lengths in miles.

Country	Length
North Korea	1,416 km (880 mi)
Russia	3,645 km (2,265 mi)
Mongolia	4,678 km (2,907 mi)
Kazakhstan	1,533 km (953 mi)
Kyrgyzstan	858 km (533 mi)
Tajikistan	414 km (257 mi)
Afghanistan	76 km (47 mi)
Pakistan	596 km (370 mi)
India	3,488 km (2,167 mi) (Note: In three sections, separated by Nepal and Bhutan; depends on the resolution of Sino-Indian border dispute, and disputes between India and Pakistan)
Nepal	1,440 km (890 mi)
Bhutan	470 km (290 mi) (Note: Depends on the resolution of territorial disputes between Bhutan and China)
Myanmar	2,185 km (1,358 mi)
Laos	423 km (263 mi)
Vietnam	1,283 km (797 mi)

== China Rim ==
The region of all countries bordering China is sometimes referred to by scholars as the China Rim, or simply as China's periphery (Chinese: 中国周边). The China Rim plays a significant role in competition between other countries and China, as is the case with America's China Containment Policy. Significant competition took place between America and China in the region after the middle of the 20th century. Currently, a greater level of scrutiny and competition are happening around the maritime portion of the rim (particularly Taiwan and Maritime Southeast Asia).

== Relevant treaties ==
Since 1689, the relevant treaties on the boundary of China are:

Parties	Gregorian date	Full name of treaty
(Qing dynasty) (Russian Empire)	7 September 1689	Treaty of Nerchinsk (Note: The legal land boundary of the Republic of China is still based on these treaties.)
(Qing dynasty) (Russian Empire)	1727	Treaty of Kiakhta
(Qing dynasty) (Russian Empire)	28 May 1858	Treaty of Aigun
(Qing dynasty) (Russian Empire)	14 November 1860	Convention of Peking
(Qing dynasty) (Russian Empire)	7 October 1864	Treaty of Tarbagatai
(Qing dynasty) (Russian Empire)	1869, 1883	Cobb Convention
(Qing dynasty) (Russian Empire)	1870	Uriasutay Convention
(Qing dynasty) (Russian Empire)	1870, 1883	Talbahatay Convention
(Qing dynasty) (Russian Empire)	1870, 1882	The Ili Boundary Convention
(Qing dynasty) (Russian Empire)	1882	Northeast Kashgar Boundary Convention
(Qing dynasty) (Russian Empire)	1883	Arakbek Estuary Boundary Convention
(Qing dynasty) (Russian Empire)	1884	Northwest Kashgar Boundary Convention
(Qing dynasty) (British Empire)	1890	Convention of Calcutta
(Qing dynasty) (Japan)	1909	Gando Convention
(Qing dynasty) (Russian Empire)	20 December 1911	Manzhouli Boundary Convention
(China)	4 September 1958	Statement of the Government of the People's Republic of China on the Territorial Sea
(China) (Myanmar)	28 January 1960	Agreement between the Government of the People's Republic of China and the Government of the Union of Myanmar on the Boundary Question between the two countries
(China) (Myanmar)	14 May 1960	Agreement between the Government of the People's Republic of China and the Government of the Union of Myanmar on the Boundary Question between the two countries
(China) (Myanmar)	1 October 1960	Boundary Treaty between the People's Republic of China and the Union of Myanmar
(China) (Myanmar)	4 January 1961	Boundary Treaty between the People's Republic of China and the Union of Myanmar
(China) (Nepal)	5 October 1961	Boundary Treaty between the People's Republic of China and the Kingdom of Nepal
(China) (Myanmar)	13 October 1961	Protocol between the Government of the People's Republic of China and the Government of the Union of Myanmar concerning the Boundary between the two countries
(China) (North Korea)	12 October 1962	Boundary Treaty between the People's Republic of China and the Democratic People's Republic of Korea, Sino-Korean Border Agreement
(China) (Mongolia)	26 December 1962	Boundary Treaty between the People's Republic of China and the People's Republic of Mongolia
(China) (Pakistan)	2 March 1963	China-Pakistan Boundary Agreement between the Government of the People's Republic of China and the Government of Pakistan Concerning the Boundary Bordering Xinjiang of China and Various Areas under Pakistan's Effective Control for Defense
(China) (Mongolia)	25 March 1963	Boundary Treaty between the People's Republic of China and the People's Republic of Mongolia
(China) (Afghanistan)	22 November 1963	Boundary Treaty between the People's Republic of China and the Kingdom of Afghanistan, or Sino-Afghan boundary treaty
(China) (North Korea)	20 March 1964	Boundary Treaty between the People's Republic of China and the Democratic People's Republic of Korea
(China) (North Korea)	20 March 1964	Sino-Korean Border Agreement, Protocol between the Government of the People's Republic of China and the Government of the Democratic People's Republic of Korea Concerning the China-Korea Boundary
(China)	10 December 1982	Signing of United Nations Convention on the Law of the Sea (including the People's Republic of China)
(China) (United Kingdom)	19 December 1984	Sino-British Joint Declaration, or Joint Declaration of the Government of the People's Republic of China and the Government of the United Kingdom of Great Britain and Northern Ireland on the Question of Hong Kong
(China) (Portugal)	13 April 1987	China-Portugal Joint Statement of the Government of the People's Republic of China and the Government of the Portuguese Republic on the Question of Macao
(China) (Soviet Union)	16 May 1991	Agreement between the People's Republic of China and the Union of Soviet Socialist Republics on the Eastern Section of the Sino-Soviet Border
(China) (Laos)	24 October 1991	Boundary Treaty between the People's Republic of China and the Lao People's Democratic Republic
(China) (Laos)	21 January 1992	Boundary Treaty between the People's Republic of China and the Lao People's Democratic Republic
(China)	25 February 1992	Law of the People's Republic of China on the Territorial Sea and the Contiguous Zone
(China) (Soviet Union)	16 March 1992	Agreement between the People's Republic of China and the Union of Soviet Socialist Republics on the Eastern Section of the Sino-Soviet Border
(China) (Laos)	31 January 1993	Protocol between the Government of the People's Republic of China and the Government of the Lao People's Democratic Republic Concerning the Boundary between the two countries
(China) (Laos)	3 December 1993	Treaty on the Boundary Regime between the Government of the People's Republic of China and the Government of the Lao People's Democratic Republic
(China) (Russia) (Mongolia)	27 January 1994	Agreement between the Government of the People's Republic of China, the Government of the Russian Federation and the Government of Mongolia on Determining the Boundary Points of the Three Countries
(China) (Laos) (Myanmar)	8 April 1994	Agreement between the Government of the People's Republic of China and the Government of the Lao People's Democratic Republic and the Government of the Union of Myanmar on Determining the Tri-Junction
(China) (Laos) (Myanmar)	11 October 1995	Agreement between the Government of the People's Republic of China and the Government of the Lao People's Democratic Republic and the Government of the Union of Myanmar on Determining the Tri-Junction
(China) (Laos)	12 August 1994	Treaty on the Boundary Regime between the Government of the People's Republic of China and the Government of the Lao People's Democratic Republic
(China) (Kazakhstan)	26 April 1994	Agreement between the People's Republic of China and the Republic of Kazakhstan on the China-Kazakhstan Boundary
(China) (Russia)	3 September 1994	Agreement between the People's Republic of China and the Russian Federation Concerning the Western Section of the China-Russia Boundary
(China)	16 November 1994	United Nations Convention on the Law of the Sea (including the People's Republic of China)
(China) (Russia)	17 October 1995	Agreement between the People's Republic of China and the Russian Federation concerning the Western Section of the China-Russia Boundary
(China)	15 May 1996	Statement of the Government of the People's Republic of China on the baselines of the Territorial Sea of the People's Republic of China
(China) (Russia) (Mongolia)	24 June 1996	Protocol between the Government of the People's Republic of China, the Government of the Russian Federation and the Government of Mongolia Concerning the Description of the Western Boundary Point of the Three Countries
(China) (Russia) (Mongolia)	24 June 1996	Signed the Protocol between the Government of the People's Republic of China, the Government of the Russian Federation and the Government of Mongolia Concerning the Description of the Eastern Junction of the Tri-Border
(China) (Kyrgyzstan)	4 July 1996	Agreement between the People's Republic of China and the Kyrgyz Republic Concerning the Boundary Area between China and the Kyrgyz Republic
(China) (Laos)	26 August 1997	Protocol supplementing to the Treaty on the Boundary Regime between the Government of the People's Republic of China and the Government of the Lao People's Democratic Republic
(China) (Kazakhstan)	24 September 1997	Supplementary Agreement between the People's Republic of China and the Republic of Kazakhstan on the China-Kazakhstan Boundary
(China) (Kazakhstan)	4 July 1998	Supplementary Agreement between the People's Republic of China and the Republic of Kazakhstan Concerning the China-Kazakhstan Boundary Area (1998)
(China) (North Korea) (Russia)	3 November 1998	Agreement between the Government of the People's Republic of China, the Government of the Democratic People's Republic of Korea and the Government of the Russian Federation Concerning the Demarcation Line of the Waters of the Three Countries along the Tumen River
(China)	29 April 1999	Decision of the Standing Committee of the National People's Congress on the Approval of the "Agreement between the Government of the People's Republic of China, the Government of the Democratic People's Republic of Korea and the Government of the Russian Federation Concerning the Demarcation Line of the Waters of the Three Countries along the Tumen River"
(China) (Russia) (Kazakhstan)	5 May 1999	Agreement between the People's Republic of China, the Russian Federation and the Republic of Kazakhstan Concerning the Determination of the Boundary Points of the Tripartite State Border
(China) (Tajikistan)	13 August 1999	Agreement between the People's Republic of China and the Republic of Tajikistan Concerning the China-Tajikistan Boundary
(China) (Kyrgyzstan) (Kazakhstan)	25 August 1999	Agreement between the People's Republic of China, the Kyrgyz Republic and the Republic of Kazakhstan Concerning the Boundary Points of the Three Countries
(China) (Kyrgyzstan)	26 August 1999	Supplementary Agreement between the People's Republic of China and the Kyrgyz Republic Concerning the National Boundary between China and the Kyrgyz Republic
(China) (Vietnam)	30 December 1999	Treaty on the Land Boundary Treaty between the People's Republic of China and the Socialist Republic of Viet Nam
(China)	29 April 2000	Decision of the Standing Committee of the National People's Congress on Ratifying the Treaty on the Land Boundary between the People's Republic of China and the Socialist Republic of Viet Nam
(China) (Tajikistan) (Kyrgyzstan)	5 July 2000	Agreement between the People's Republic of China, the Republic of Tajikistan and the Kyrgyz Republic Concerning the Tri-Border Points
(China) (Vietnam)	25 December 2000	Agreement between the People's Republic of China and the Socialist Republic of Vietnam on the Delimitation of the Territorial Sea, Exclusive Economic Zone and Continental Shelf between the two countries in the Beibu Gulf
(China) (Tajikistan)	17 May 2002	Supplementary Agreement between the People's Republic of China and the Republic of Tajikistan concerning the China-Tajikistan Boundary
(China) (North Korea) (Russia)	20 June 2002	Protocol between the Government of the People's Republic of China, the Democratic People's Republic of Korea and the Government of the Russian Federation Concerning the Description of the Boundary Points of the People's Republic of China, the Democratic People's Republic of Korea and the Russian Federation on the Tumen River
(China) (North Korea) (Russia)	29 March 2003	Protocol between the Government of the People's Republic of China, the Democratic People's Republic of Korea and the Government of the Russian Federation Concerning the Description of the Boundary Points of the People's Republic of China, the Democratic People's Republic of Korea and the Russian Federation on the Tumen River
(China)	25 June 2004	Decision of the Standing Committee of the National People's Congress on ratifying the "Agreement between the People's Republic of China and the Socialist Republic of Vietnam on the Delimitation of the Territorial Sea, Exclusive Economic Zone and Continental Shelf in the Beibu Gulf"
(China) (Russia)	14 October 2004	Supplementary Agreement between the People's Republic of China and the Russian Federation concerning the Eastern Section of the National Boundary between China and Russia
(China) (Russia)	2 June 2005	Supplementary Agreement between the People's Republic of China and the Russian Federation concerning the Eastern Section of the National Boundary between China and Russia
(China) (Vietnam) (Laos)	10 October 2006	Treaty of the People's Republic of China, the Socialist Republic of Viet Nam and the Lao People's Democratic Republic on Determining the Boundary Points of the Three Countries
(China)	28 February 2007	Decision of the Standing Committee of the National People's Congress on ratifying the "Treaty of the People's Republic of China, the Socialist Republic of Viet Nam and the Lao People's Democratic Republic on Determining the Boundary Points of the Three Countries", Identifying the Three Countries Decision of the Treaty on Border Crossings
(China) (Tajikistan) (Afghanistan)	5 June 2012	The Agreement between the People's Republic of China, the Republic of Tajikistan and the Islamic Republic of Afghanistan on Determining the Boundary Points of the Three Countries
(China)	10 September 2012	Statement of the Government of the People's Republic of China on the baselines of the territorial sea of the Diaoyu Dao and its Affiliated Islands
(China) (Tajikistan) (Afghanistan)	14 December 2014	Agreement between the People's Republic of China, the Republic of Tajikistan and the Islamic Republic of Afghanistan on Determining the Boundary Points of the Three Countries
(China) (Philippines)	July 2016	China Adheres to the Position of Settling Through Negotiation the Relevant Disputes Between China and the Philippines in the South China Sea

== Gallery ==
Style of PRC's boundary marker, with its national emblem on the top.

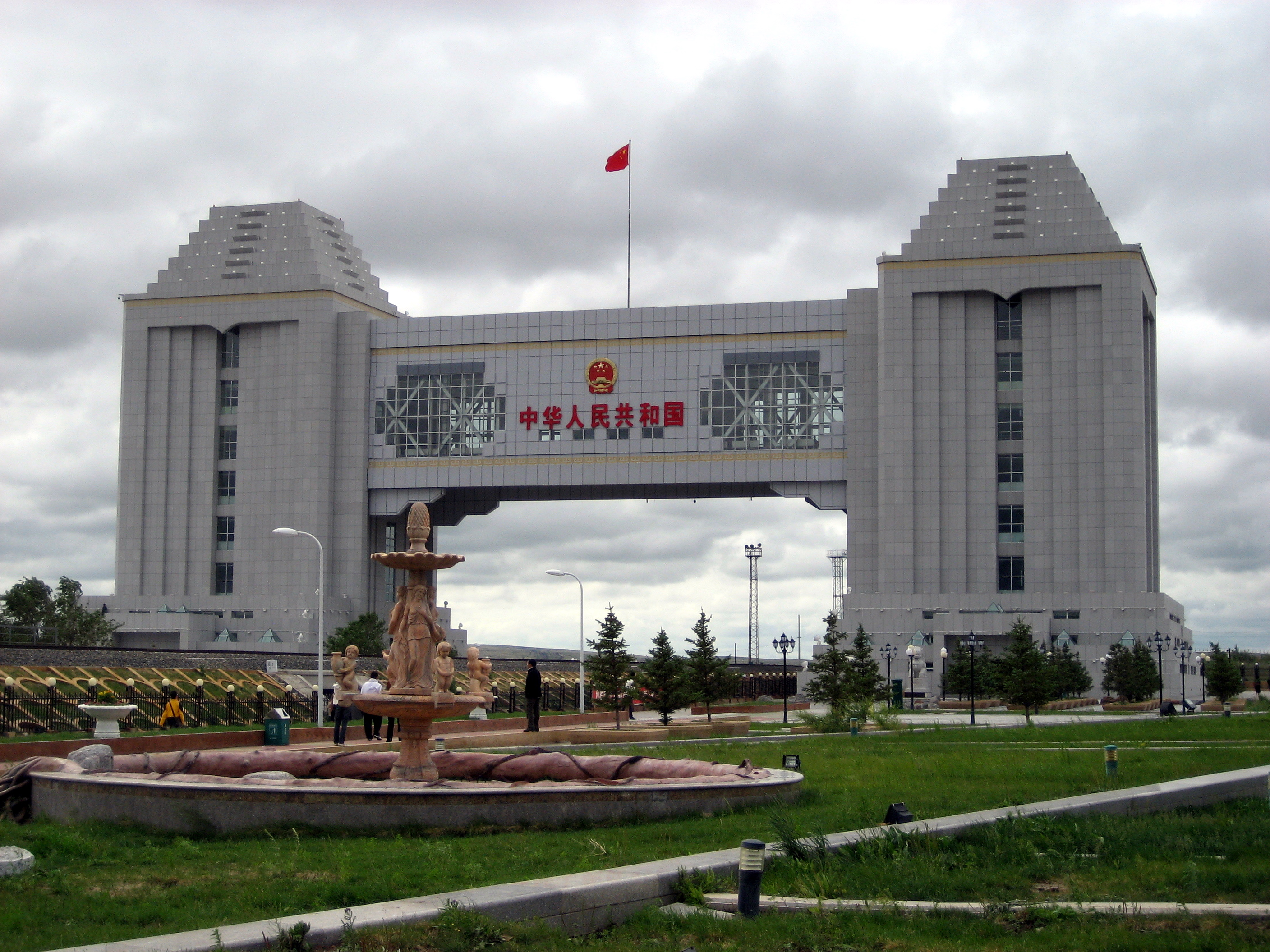
Sino-Russian border railway port at Manzhouli.

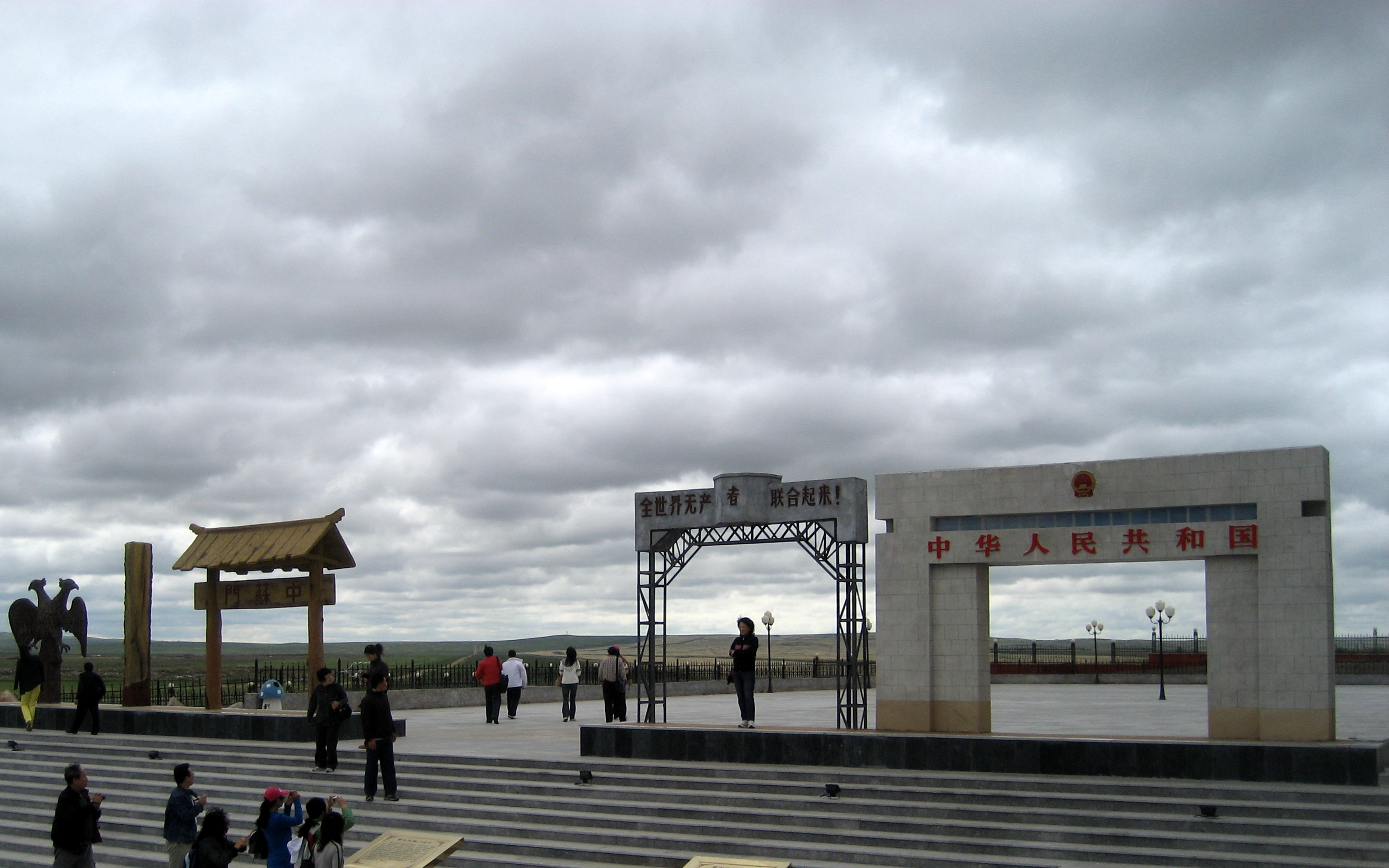
Models of the Sino-Russian border port in Manzhouli from various historical periods displayed in the square.

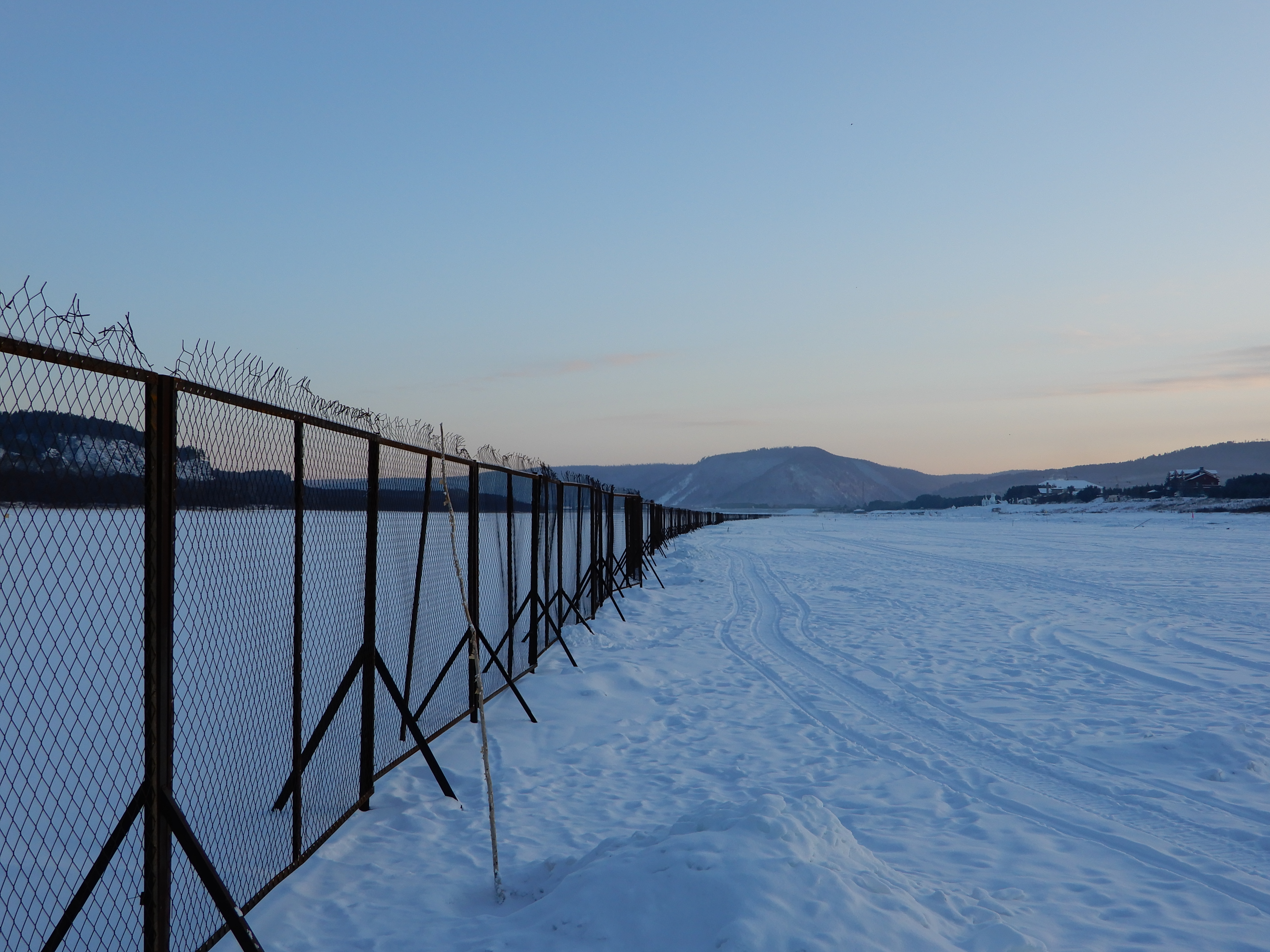
The northernmost point of China, north of Mohe in Heilongjiang, with Russia on the other side of the fence.

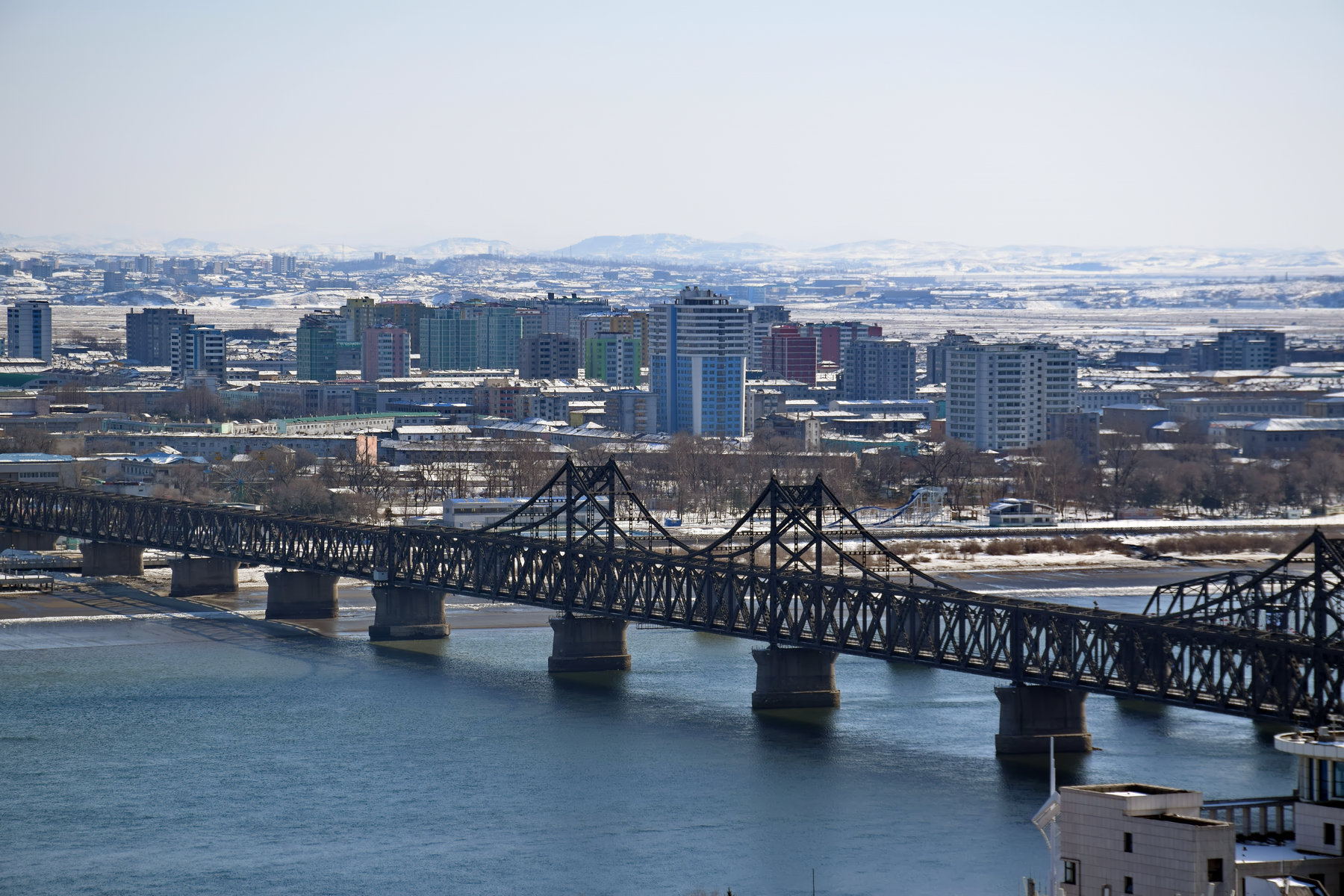
Aerial view of Sinuiju in North Korea from Dandong, China, with the Sino-Korean Friendship Bridge and the Yalu River on the China–North Korea border.

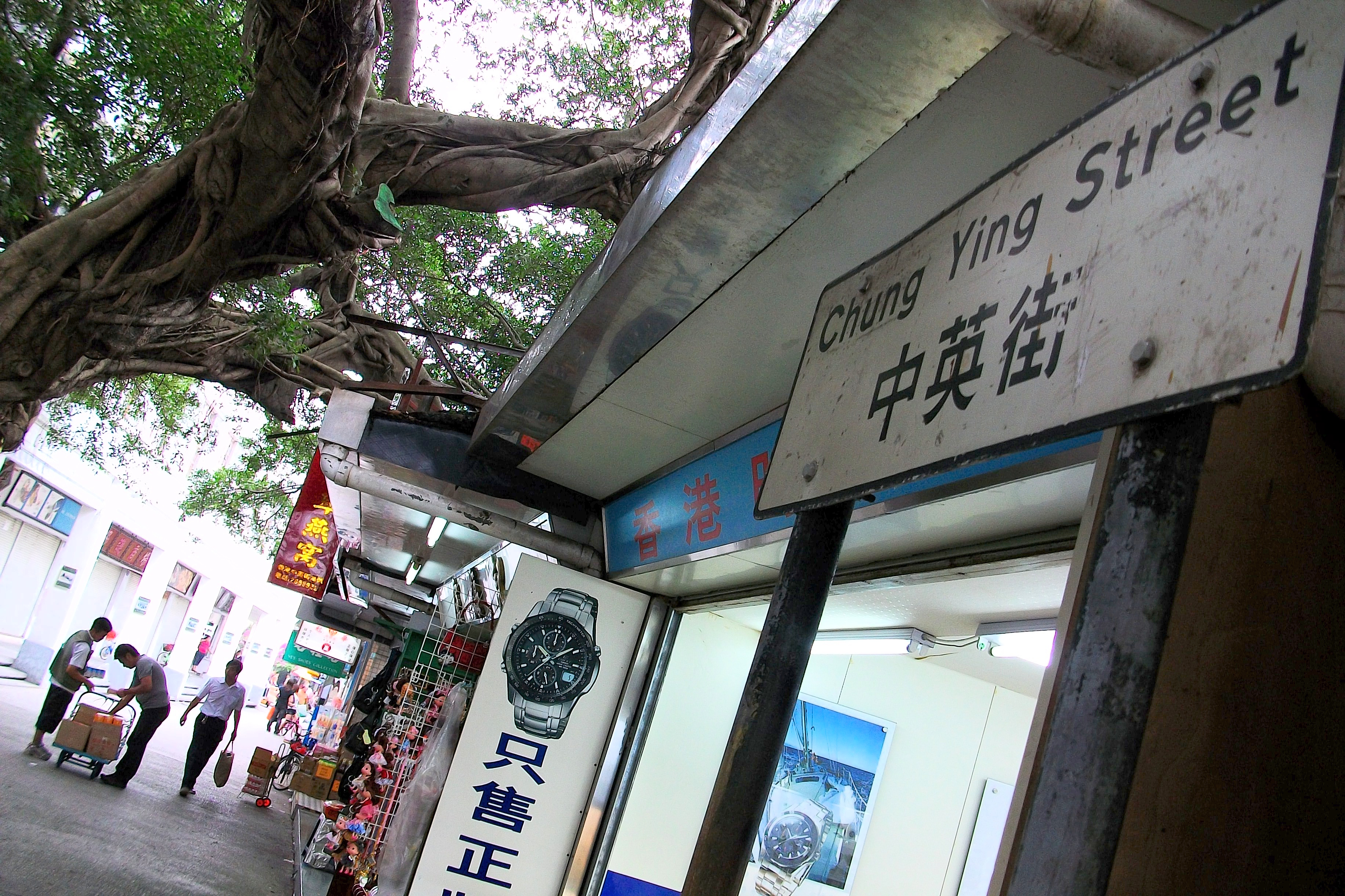
Chung Ying Street at the border of Shenzhen and Hong Kong

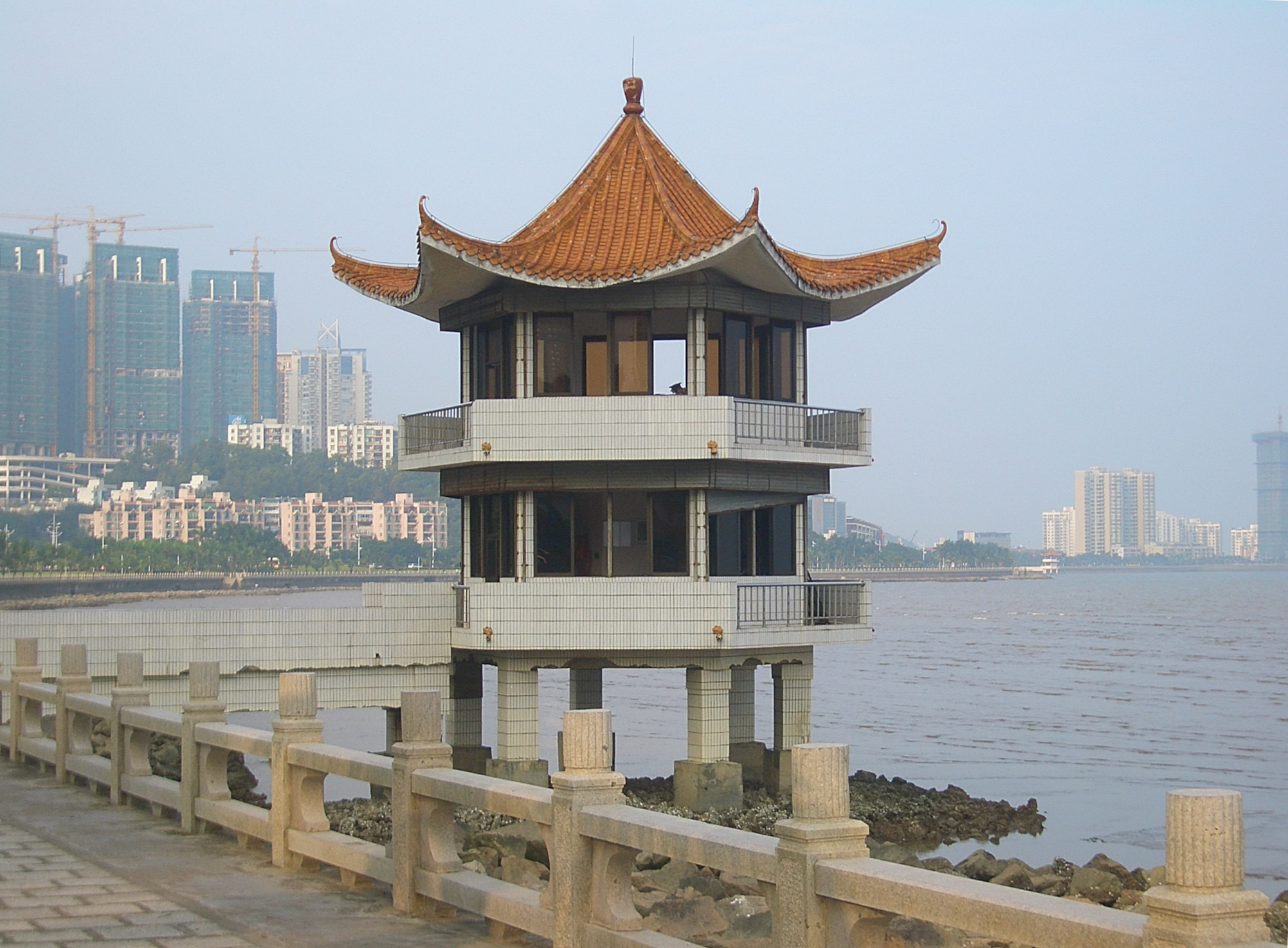
Border guard booth on Lovers South Road in Zhuhai, with Macau

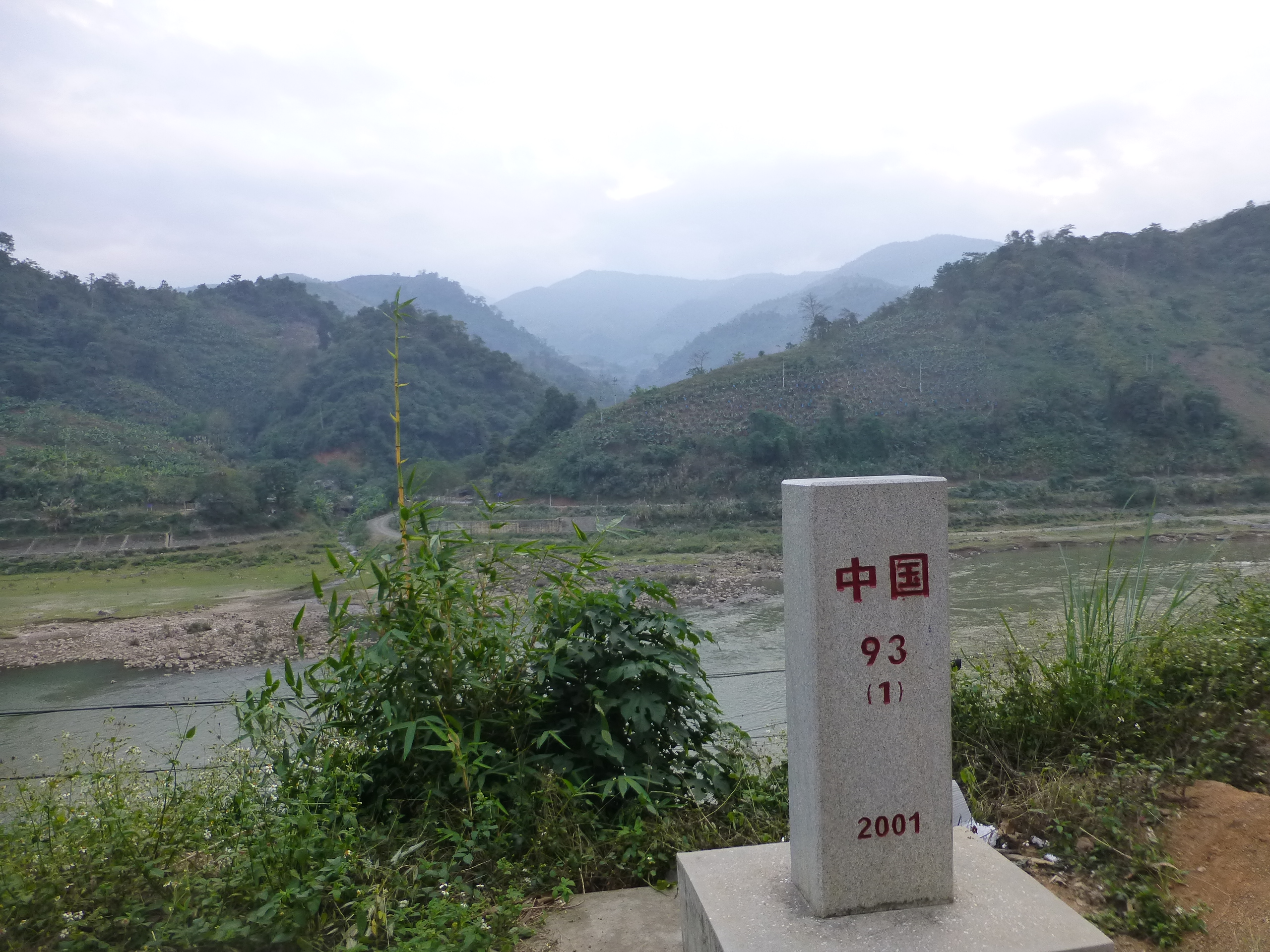
The Red River, the border between China and Vietnam.

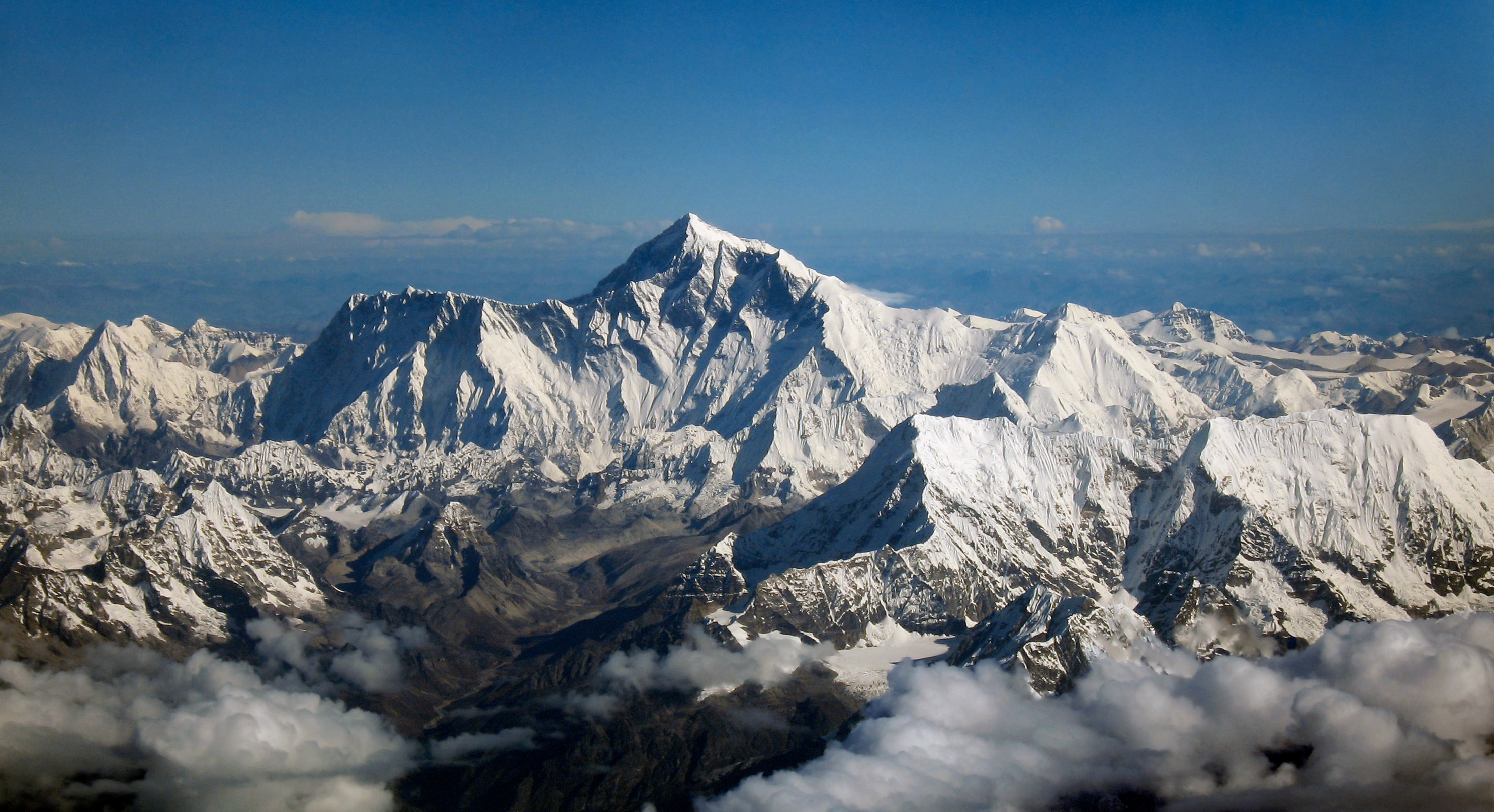
The Sino-Nepalese border passes through Mount Everest.

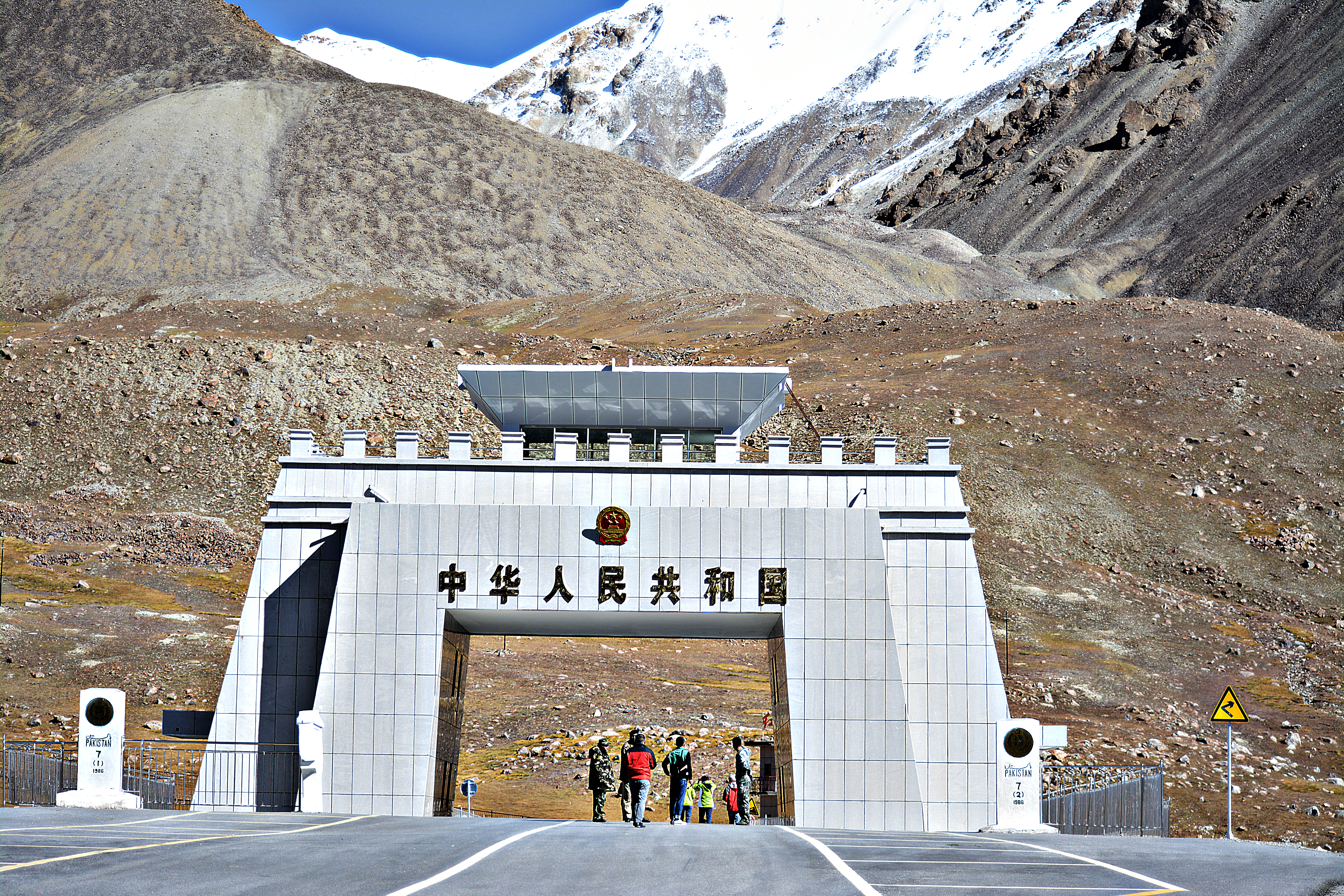
The Khunjerab Pass, at the border between China and Pakistan.

== See also ==
- History of Sino-Russian Border Treaties
- Ports of entry of China
- Territorial changes of the People's Republic of China
- Territorial disputes of the People's Republic of China
- Chinese–Korean border fence
- McMahon Line
- Tumen River
- Boundaries of Hong Kong
- Boundaries of Macau
- Frontier Closed Area
- Sino-Indian border dispute
