= Tong To =

Village in Hong Kong

Coordinates: 22.542644°N 114.211388°E

Tong To (Chinese: 塘肚) is a village in the Sha Tau Kok area of North District of Hong Kong.

== Administration ==
Tong To is a recognized village under the New Territories Small House Policy. It is one of the villages represented within the Sha Tau Kok District Rural Committee. For electoral purposes, Tong To is part of the Sha Ta constituency, which is currently represented by Ko Wai-kei.

== History ==
At the time of the 1911 census, the population of Tong To was 104. The number of males was 47.

The three Hakka villages of Tam Shui Hang, Tong To and Shan Tsui had a total population of around 1,000 persons in 1961. During the Cultural Revolution, the villagers of these three places removed a Tin Hau image from a Man Mo temple located across the border in Mainland China and built a temple at the western end of Kong Ha Village to house the image. The temple was under the management of a special trust, the Sam Wo Tong (三和堂).

== See also ==
- Shek Chung Au
