= Boundaries of Hong Kong =

Regulated administrative border

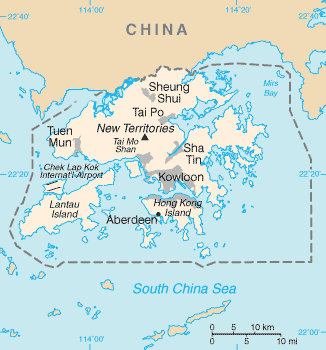
Map of the boundaries of Hong Kong since 1997, dotted in grey dash lines surrounding Hong Kong.

The Boundaries of Hong Kong, officially the Boundary of the Administrative Division of the Hong Kong Special Administrative Region of the People's Republic of China (Chinese: 中華人民共和國香港特別行政區行政區域界綫), is a regulated administrative border with border control in force under the One country, two systems constitutional principle, which separates the Hong Kong Special Administrative Region from mainland China, by land border fence of 30 km (19 mi) and maritime boundary of 733 km (455 mi), enforcing a separate immigration and customs-controlled jurisdiction from mainland China.

The boundaries of Hong Kong are patrolled and controlled by the Hong Kong Police Force and its Marine Region and the Immigration Department at land and sea. The land boundary also includes a buffer zone, known as Frontier Closed Area.

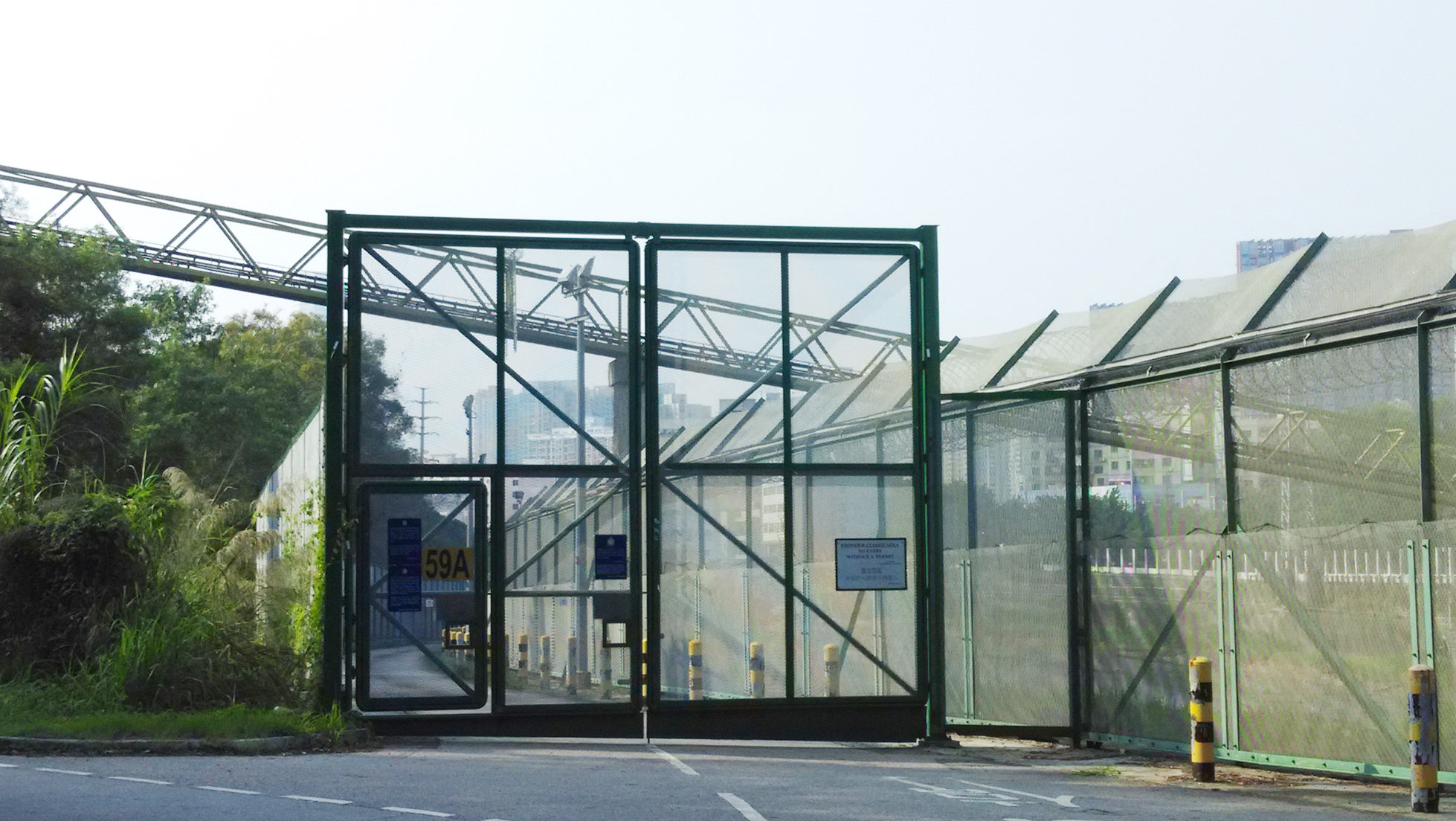
Border Road is enclosed by fences

== History ==
After the First Opium War and territorial establishment of Hong Kong, the Hong Kong Island was ceded by the Qing Empire to the United Kingdom of Great Britain and Ireland through Treaty of Nanjing in 1842, not marking any official maritime boundaries.

In 1860, the Convention of Peking extended the cession to include Kowloon with the land boundary limits until "Boundary street in Kowloon", and in 1898 with additional land of New Territories was leased for 99-years to the British under the Convention for the Extension of Hong Kong Territory with the Sham Chun River primarily marking the boundary between British Hong Kong and Qing dynasty.

Between the years of 1941 and 1945 during the Japanese occupation of Hong Kong, the boundaries of Hong Kong may or may not have been clearly distinguished as the neighbouring part of Southern China bordering Hong Kong was also occupied by the Japanese Empire. After the Japanese surrender in 1945, all British government institutions in Hong Kong, including the land boundary primarily running across the Sham Chun River were restored.

Since the late 1940s, there has been a refugee wave from mainland China due to the instability inland, and the British authorities in Hong Kong were forced to make a decision regarding the border to prevent an influx of refugees from overwhelming the already-crowded city. In April 1949, the British decided to close the border and end the free movement that existed prior. By 1952, the Chinese authorities had done the same, and the border officially became closed and required permits to cross through.

In 1984, the governments of the United Kingdom and the People's Republic of China (PRC) concluded the Sino-British Joint Declaration on the Question of Hong Kong, under which the sovereignty of the leased territories, together with Hong Kong Island and Kowloon (south of Boundary Street) ceded under the Convention of Peking (1860), was transferred to the PRC on 1 July 1997, maintaining the current land boundary primarily running across the Sham Chun River, however the Hong Kong Basic Law modified and extended the size of Hong Kong's maritime boundary with mainland China in 1997.

=== Historical maps ===
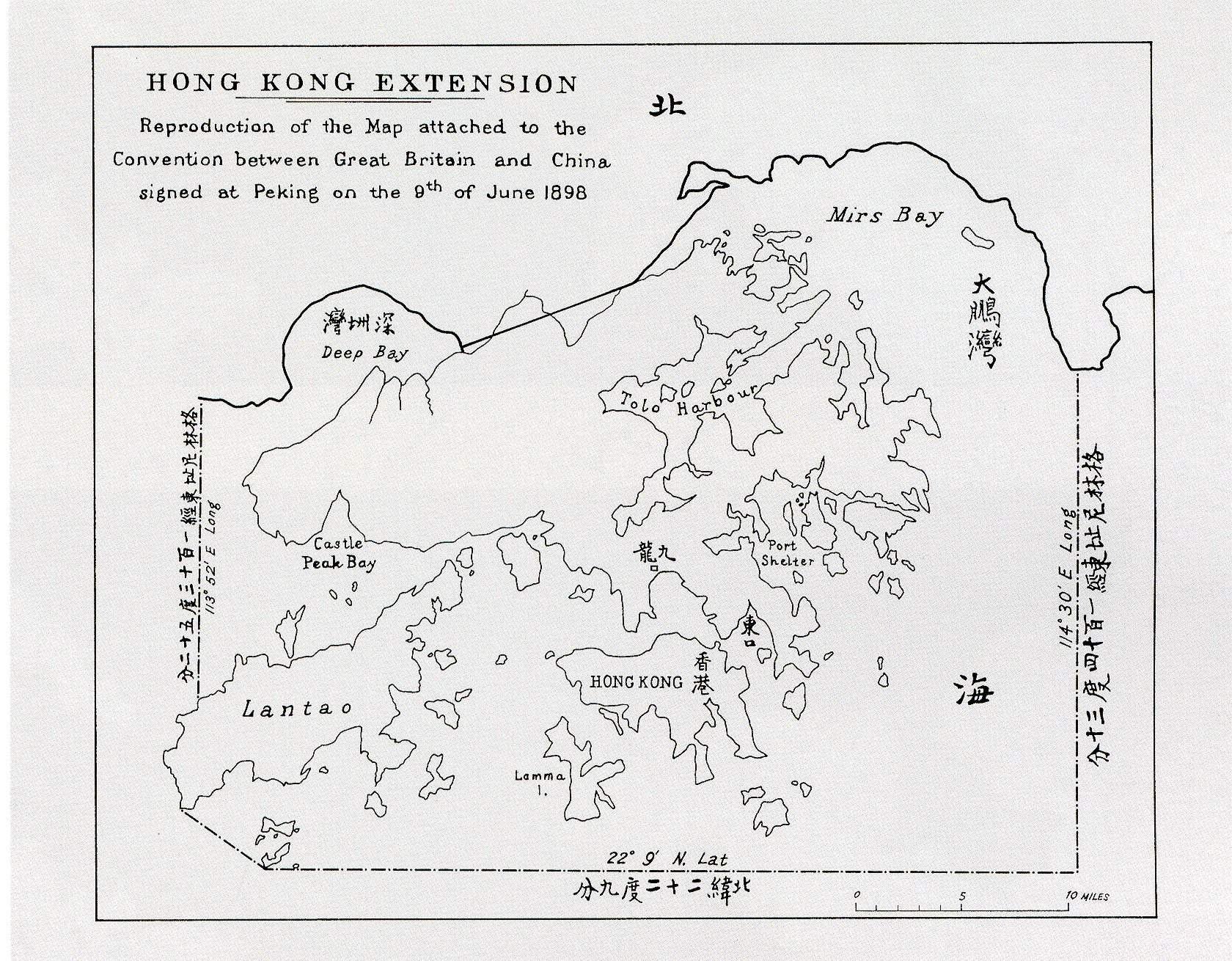
One of the earliest documents, marking the boundaries of the then British Hong Kong with Qing dynasty.

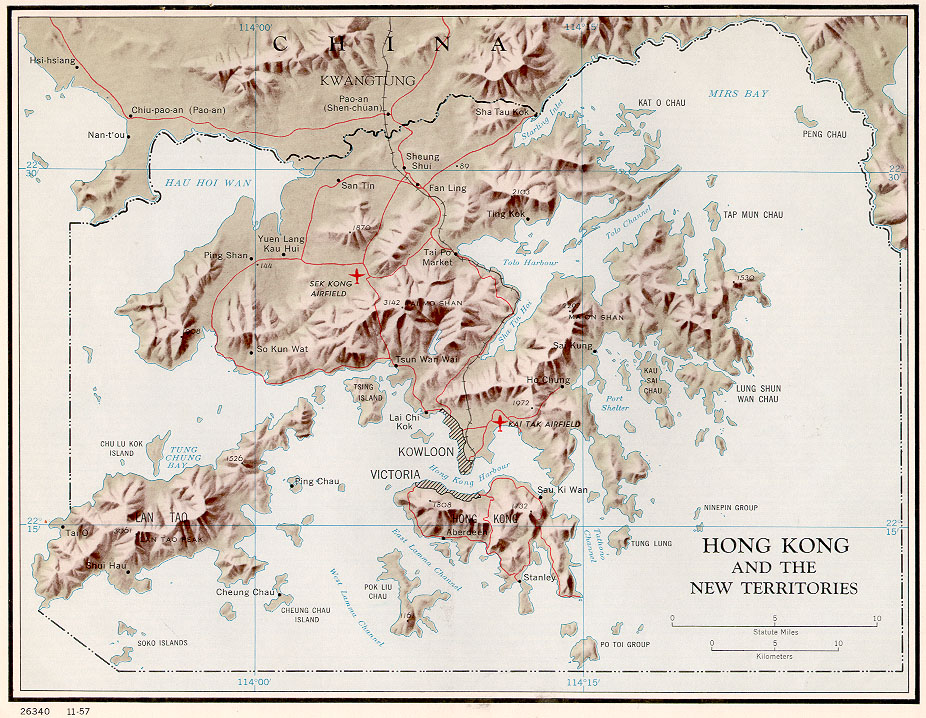
Map of the boundaries of Hong Kong during the Colonial period until 1997.

== Immigration control points ==
As of 2024, 8 out of Hong Kong's 13 points of entry or border crossings controlled by the Immigration Department are located on or cross the land border fence. Entry and exit immigration clearance into Hong Kong by sea can be cleared at 3 ferry terminals:, and the other 2 out of 13 immigration clearance points in Hong Kong are located in the Hong Kong West Kowloon railway station and at the Hong Kong International Airport.

| No. | Hong Kong Control Point | District in Hong Kong | Counterpart Port | Counterpart District and City | Type of border crossing and coordinates | Opened | Website |
|---|---|---|---|---|---|---|---|
| 1 | Hong Kong International Airport 香港國際機場 | Chep Lap Kok, Islands District | — | | Airport; 22°18′32″N 113°54′52″E | 1998 | hongkongairport.com |
| 2 | Hong Kong West Kowloon railway station 香港西九龍 | Tsim Sha Tsui, Yau Tsim Mong District | (Juxtaposed control) | | Juxtaposed rail border crossing 22°18′13″N 114°09′54″E | 2018 | ka.sz.gov.cn (mainland China) td.gov.hk (Hong Kong) highspeed.mtr.com.hk |
| 3 | Lo Wu Control Point 羅湖管制站 | Lo Wu, North District | Luohu Port 罗湖口岸 | Luohu District, Shenzhen | Land border crossing 22°31′56″N 114°06′48″E | 1986 | ka.sz.gov.cn (mainland China) td.gov.hk (Hong Kong) |
| 4 | Lok Ma Chau Control Point 落馬洲管制站 | Lok Ma Chau, Yuen Long District | Huanggang Port 皇岗口岸 | Futian District, Shenzhen | Land border crossing 22.52074°N 114.07496°E | 1989 | ka.sz.gov.cn (mainland China) td.gov.hk (Hong Kong) |
| 5 | Lok Ma Chau Spur Line Control Point 落馬洲支線管制站 | Lok Ma Chau, Yuen Long District | Futian Port 福田口岸 | Futian District, Shenzhen | Land border crossing 22.51577°N 114.06877°E | 2007 | ka.sz.gov.cn (mainland China) td.gov.hk (Hong Kong) |
| 6 | Man Kam To Control Point 文錦渡管制站 | Man Kam To, North District | Wenjindu Port 文锦渡口岸 | Luohu District, Shenzhen | Land border crossing 22.5370°N 114.1294°E | 1976 | ka.sz.gov.cn (mainland China) td.gov.hk (Hong Kong) |
| 7 | Sha Tau Kok Control Point 沙頭角管制站 | Sha Tau Kok, North District | Shatoujiao Port 沙头角口岸 | Yantian District, Shenzhen | Land border crossing 22°32′56.8″N 114°13′23.8″E | 2005 | ka.sz.gov.cn (mainland China) td.gov.hk (Hong Kong) |
| 8 | Hong Kong–Macau Ferry Terminal 港澳客輪碼頭 | Sheung Wan, Central and Western District | — | | Border crossing clearance in Hong Kong for crossing Hong Kong boundaries by sea 22°17′21.74″N 114°9′7.75″E | 1985 | mardep.gov.hk |
| 9 | Hong Kong China Ferry Terminal 中國客運碼頭 | Tsim Sha Tsui, Yau Tsim Mong District | — | | Border crossing clearance in Hong Kong for crossing Hong Kong boundaries by sea 22.29931°N 114.16725°E | 1988 | mardep.gov.hk |
| 10 | Shenzhen Bay Control Point 深圳灣管制站 | (Juxtaposed control) | Shenzhen Bay Port 深圳湾口岸 | Nanshan District, Shenzhen | Juxtaposed Land border crossing 22.5039°N 113.9447°E | 2007 | ka.sz.gov.cn (mainland China) td.gov.hk (Hong Kong) |
| 11 | Kai Tak Cruise Terminal 啟德郵輪碼頭 | Kai Tak Development, Kowloon City District | — | | Border crossing clearance in Hong Kong for crossing Hong Kong boundaries by sea 22.3074°N 114.2128°E | 2013 | kaitakcruiseterminal.com.hk |
| 12 | Hong Kong-Zhuhai-Macao Bridge Control Point 港珠澳大橋管制站 | Chek Lap Kok, Islands District | Hong Kong-Zhuhai-Macao Bridge Zhuhai Highway Port 港珠澳大桥珠海公路口岸 | Xiangzhou, Zhuhai | Border crossing the Hong Kong–Zhuhai–Macau Bridge; 22°16′59″N 113°46′50″E | 2018 | td.gov.hk (Hong Kong) fsm.gov.mo (Macau) |
| 12 | Hong Kong-Zhuhai-Macao Bridge Control Point 港珠澳大橋管制站 | Chek Lap Kok, Islands District | Posto de Migração da Ponte Hong Kong-Zhuhai-Macau 港珠澳大橋澳門邊檢大樓 | Novos Aterros Urbanos de Macau, Macau | Border crossing the Hong Kong–Zhuhai–Macau Bridge; 22°16′59″N 113°46′50″E | 2018 | td.gov.hk (Hong Kong) fsm.gov.mo (Macau) |
| 13 | Heung Yuen Wai Control Point 香園圍管制站 | Heung Yuen Wai, North District | Liantang Port 莲塘口岸 | Luohu District, Shenzhen | Land border crossing 22°33′15.43″N 114°9′8.72″E | 2020 | ka.sz.gov.cn (mainland China) td.gov.hk (Hong Kong) |

== See also ==
- Borders of China
- Boundaries of Macau
- Frontier Closed Area
