= Chung Ying Street =

Street in Hong Kong and Shenzhen, China

Coordinates: 22.5465°N 114.226°E

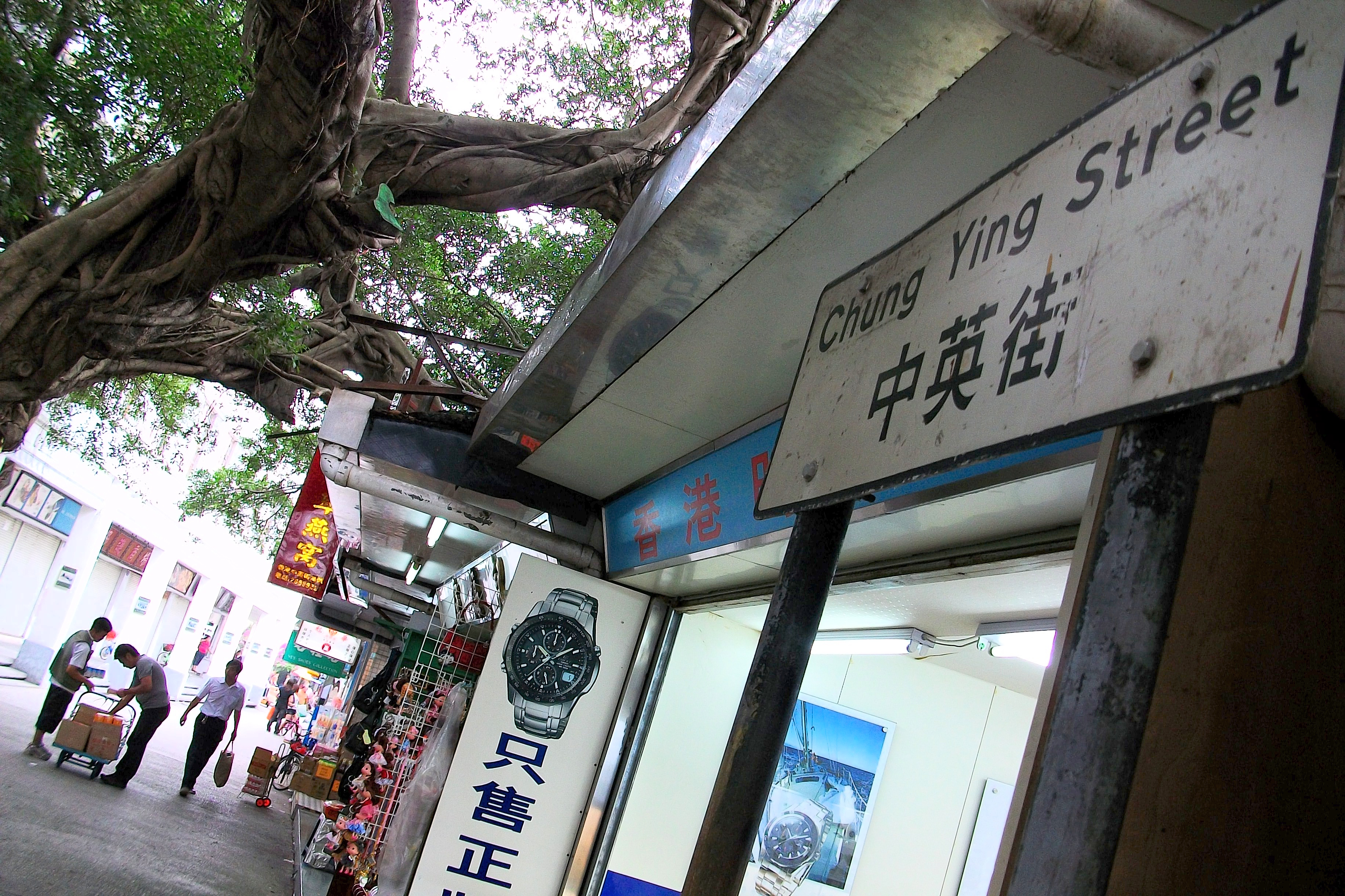
- Traditional Chinese: 中英街
- Simplified Chinese: 中英街
- Literal meaning: Sino-British Street
Transcriptions
Standard Mandarin
- Hanyu Pinyin: Zhōngyīng Jiē
- Wade–Giles: Chung^{1}-In^{1} Chieh^{1}
Hakka
- Romanization: Zung^{1}-Yin^{1} Gai^{1}
Yue: Cantonese
- Jyutping: Zung^{1}-Jing^{1} Gaai^{1}

Alternative Chinese name
- Traditional Chinese: 中興街
- Simplified Chinese: 中兴街
Transcriptions
Standard Mandarin
- Hanyu Pinyin: Zhōngxìng Jiē
- Wade–Giles: Chung^{1}hsieng^{1} Chieh^{1}
Hakka
- Romanization: Zung^{1}hin^{1} Gai^{1}
Yue: Cantonese
- Jyutping: Zung^{1}hing^{1} Gaai^{1}

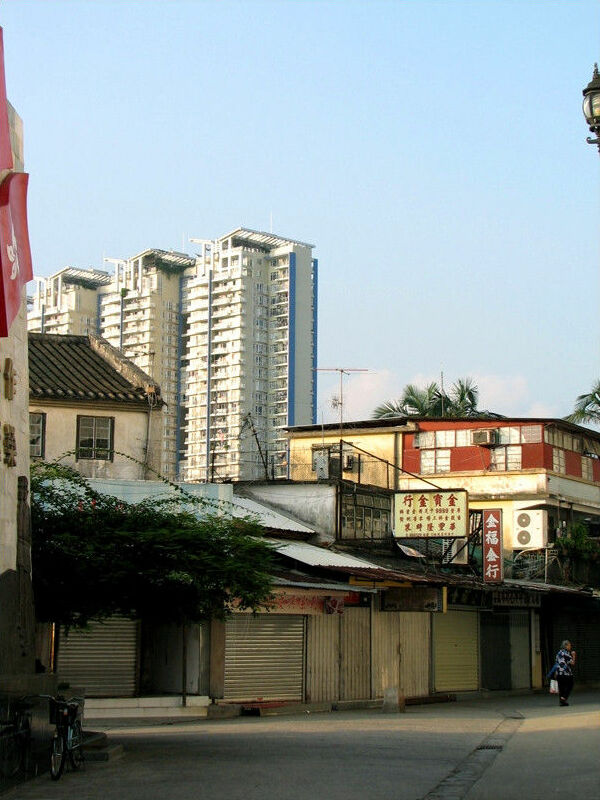
Chung Ying Street, with the memorial tablet on the left side

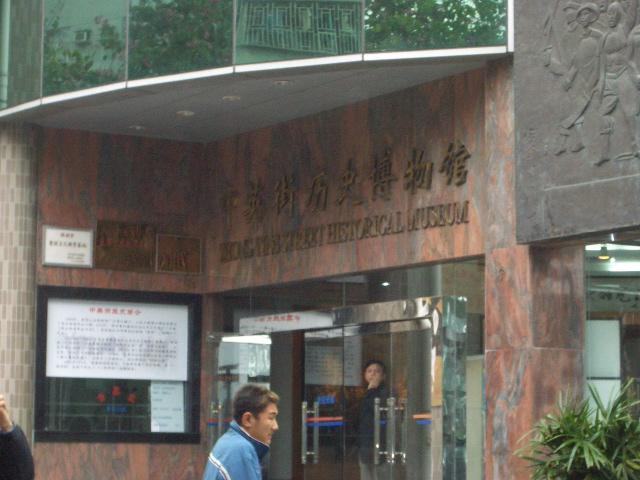
Chung Ying Street Historical Museum

Chung Ying Street (Chinese: 中英街) is a street on the border between Hong Kong and Shenzhen, within the border town of Sha Tau Kok (Hong Kong) and Shatoujiao (Shenzhen). One side of the street belongs to Hong Kong and the other belongs to mainland China.

== Etymology and history ==
In Cantonese, Chung means China and Ying England or the United Kingdom. The name is a mark of history of the Second Convention of Peking, a treaty that China under the Qing dynasty was forced to lease New Territories to Britain in 1899.

The street was a river in 1899, and the British used the high water mark as the border. The river was too shallow at the section of Sha Tau Kok. It dried before the coming of World War II. The residents on both dried river sides then erected their shops to trade. The dried river then renamed to Chung Hing Street (traditional Chinese: 中興街; simplified Chinese: 中兴街), and later renamed to Chung Ying Street.

The town of Sha Tau Kok flourished for that period of time. After World War II, with large influx of refugees from China, the British colonial government decided to close the border and the town fell within the Frontier Closed Area. The border town declined since then.

Chung Ying Street was once a famous place for shopping. In the 1990s, when China was still closed to the world, Chinese tourists visited to buy foreign goods, mostly watches, clothing and jewellery. However, the prosperity has declined in the early 21st century, due to a policy allowing most people from Mainland China to apply to visit Hong Kong directly, causing Chung Ying Street to transform into a place for historical sight-seeing. The PRC government has built a museum about the history of Chung Ying Street to attract tourists again.

== Gaining access ==
The Hong Kong Government website states access to the street from Hong Kong is only permitted under certain circumstances, based on need.

Residents of mainland China can gain access by buying an organised tour ticket from the tour operator at the Chung Ying Street entrance in Shenzhen. Since 2018, there is no longer a fee associated with visiting Chung Ying Street, but tourists still need to make an appointment in advance and visit within restricted opening hours of a day.

== See also ==
- List of streets and roads in Hong Kong
- Convention for the Extension of Hong Kong Territory
- 1967 Hong Kong riots
- Indigenous inhabitants of the New Territories
