= Frontier Closed Area =

Regulated border zone in Hong Kong

Coordinates: 22.53°N 114.1°E

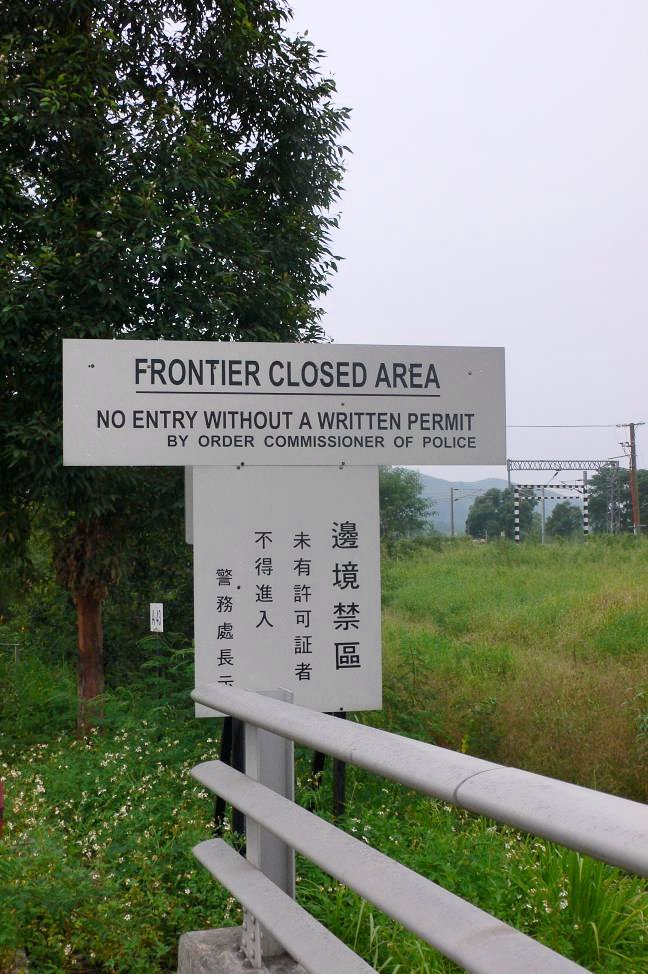
- Frontier Closed Area signboard at Lo Wu
- Traditional Chinese: 邊境禁區
- Simplified Chinese: 边境禁区
Transcriptions
Standard Mandarin
- Hanyu Pinyin: biānjìng jìnqū
- Wade–Giles: Pien-ching Chin-Chʻü
Yue: Cantonese
- Yale Romanization: Bīn gíng gam kēui
- Jyutping: Bin1 ging2 gam3 keoi1

The Frontier Closed Area (Chinese: 邊境禁區) is a regulated border zone in Hong Kong that extends inwards from the border with mainland China. It was established by the Frontier Closed Area Order, 1951, and 1984.

Established to prevent illegal migrants and other illegal activities from mainland China and elsewhere by land and sea, the closed area is fenced along its perimeter to serve as a buffer between the closed border and the rest of the territory patrolled and controlled by Hong Kong Police Force and its Marine Region and the Immigration Department at land and sea. Developments are tightly controlled within the area, leading to less construction and causing most of the area to become a natural habitat for animals and plants.

For anyone to enter the area, a Closed Area Permit is required from the Hong Kong Police Force, unless crossing the land boundary through the Frontier Closed Area with a valid travel document by land and/or sea.

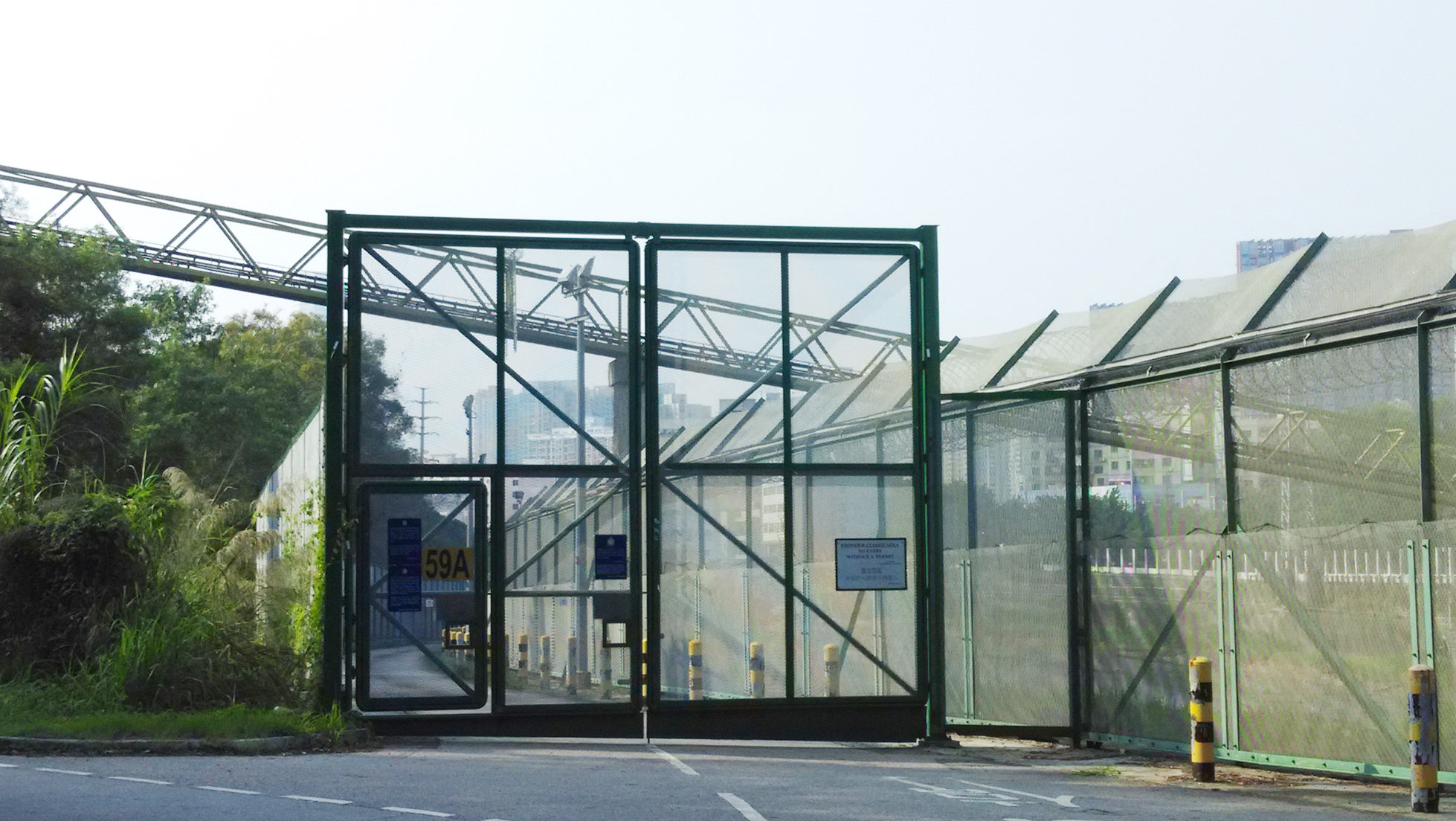
Border Road is enclosed by fences

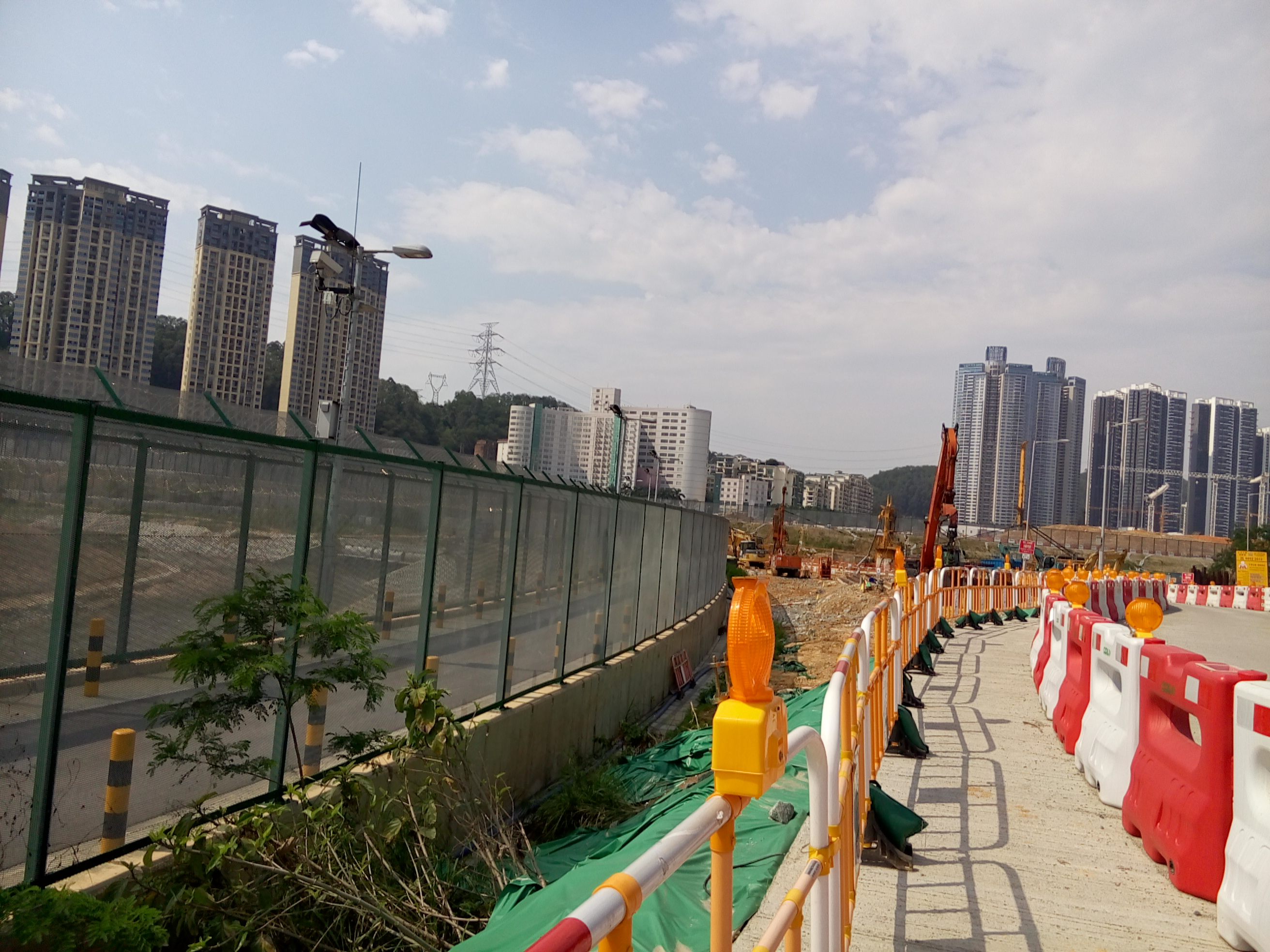
Liantang, Shenzhen as viewed from Ta Kwu Ling with Border Road and fences in the foreground

== History ==
The area was established under the Frontier Closed Area Order in June 1951 by Hong Kong Governor Alexander Grantham.

In order to fight gun smuggling during the Korean War, a curfew was put in place in the closed area in 1952. Villagers had to stay inside from midnight to 4:00 am unless they acquired a special permit from the police. Following the war, the curfew was retained to help control illegal immigration.

A simple chain link wire fence was built at the border between 1950 and 1953. It was later described as "flimsy" in the South China Morning Post, in that groups of refugees could press it flat simply by leaning against it.

The boundaries of the Frontier Closed Area were adjusted under the Frontier Closed Area Order, 1959, gazetted on 20 February 1959.

By 1962, thousands of undocumented migrants were attempting to enter Hong Kong each day. In response, a second, more robust fence, made of Dannert wire, was built slightly south of the original fence in May 1962.

Under the Frontier Closed Area (Amendment) Order 1982, gazetted on 24 June 1982, the area was expanded by four square kilometres (1.5 sq mi) in western Mai Po, near Pak Hok Chau.

The frontier area was further adjusted with the Frontier Closed Area Order 1984, gazetted on 7 September 1984. The amendments reflected the relocation of the Man Kam To Control Point, and also completely excluded Lei Uk Village from the closed area.

Border patrol duties were transferred from the British Army to the Field Patrol Detachment in October 1992.

The nighttime curfew in the Frontier Closed Area was discontinued from 1 August 1994. Secretary for Security Alistair Asprey stated this was to "balance individual rights and the need to combat illegal immigration".

=== 2006 reduction proposal ===
Reduction of the FCA from 28 to 8 square kilometres (10.8 to 3.1 mi^{2}) was proposed in September 2006 by the government. According to the adopted proposal, most of the FCA will be de-designated and the FCA only maintained around border crossings.

This will be made possible by the building of a secondary fence along the border roads, such that most villages in the FCA will fall outside of it without having to compromise the integrity of the border. A planning study was to have been undertaken by the Planning Department.

Depending upon the progress of the new fence, the reduction will be implemented in four stages with scheduled completion in early 2015. Members of the public will no longer need to obtain a permit to enter the excluded areas.

==== First phase of implementation ====
On 15 February 2012, areas around Sha Tau Kok (but not the town itself), as well as Mai Po, were taken out of the Frontier Closed Area, opening up 740 hectares (1,800 acres) of land for public access. A checkpoint on the original perimeter, at Shek Chung Au, was decommissioned and its functions taken over by a new checkpoint outside of Sha Tau Kok.

==== Environmental issues ====
Environmentalists and the WWF have pointed out that the proposal will have negative impacts on the ecology of the excluded areas.

== Closed Area Permit ==
A Closed Area Permit is a document issued by the Hong Kong Police Force to allow for people with ties or residence in the area to travel in and out of the Frontier Closed Area. Visitors to the Mai Po Marshes are also required to apply for a Mai Po Marshes Entry Permit from the Agriculture, Fisheries and Conservation Department.

=== Border Road ===
Border Road (Chinese: 邊界道路) is a road along the south bank of Sham Chun River, and the northernmost road in Hong Kong. Since January 2016, it is amongst the only remaining places within the Frontier Closed Area (along with an area around and within parts of Sha Tau Kok). Currently it is used for patrolling purposes only and public entry is forbidden. It starts from Mai Po Nature Reserve in Yuen Long and ends along Lin Ma Hang Road.

== Settlement ==
Frontier Closed Area since 2016

- Lok Ma Chau District (includes Lok Ma Chau Checkpoint, Lok Ma Chau Spur Line Checkpoint, parts of Lok Ma Chau compensation wetland, parts of Mai Po Natural Reserves and parts of Pak Hok Chau)
- Ta Kwu Leng District (includes Lo Wu Checkpoint, small parts of Lo Wu Village, estuaries of Ng Tung River, Yuen Leng Tsai, Man Kam To Checkpoint and estuaries of Nam Hang River) (Note: Lin Ma Hang village had been released from the frontier closed area since 2016. However, the only road connecting the village and Ta Kwu Ling remained as a part of the closed area. Anyone aiming to enter Lin Ma Hang must apply for a closed area permit unless they travel via forest trails. A path has been cut out that runs approximately parallel to the road in the closed area that can be walked on foot. It has some rough and two steep but short sections. A police post is set 1,300 metres (4,300 ft) away from the entry of the village in order to prohibit illegal entry to the closed area.)
- Sha Tau Kok District (includes Sha Tau Kok Town, Sha Tau Kok Checkpoint, parts of Shan Tsui, Yuen Tun Shan, Kong Ha Village, San Kwai Tin Village, Pak Kung Au and parts of Mo Lo Lau) (Note: Lo Wu Village was released from the frontier closed area since 2016. However, the only road connecting the village and Man Kam To main road remained as a part of the closed area. Large number of village house lie adjacent to the border fence. Anyone intending to enter the village must apply for a closed area permit so that they can enter the village by using the road or railway.)
- Chung Ying Street District
- The entirety of Starling Inlet

== See also ==
- Borders of China
- Boundaries of Hong Kong
