= Octopus (disambiguation) =

An octopus is a sea animal with eight limbs.

Octopus may also refer to:

== Film and television ==
- Octopus (2000 film), an American film produced by Nu Image
- Octopus (2015 film), an Indian Kannada-language mystery thriller film
- Is Your Daughter Safe? or The Octopus, a 1927 film
- Los pulpos or The Octopuses, a 1948 Argentine film
- La piovra or The Octopus, a 1984–2001 Italian television series
- Doctor Octopus, fictional Marvel character
- Lady Octopus, fictional Marvel character
- The Octopus, a fictional pair of Siamese twins in The City of Lost Children
- Octopus, a character in the 2002 Disney animated film Return to Never Land
- Le Poulpe, a 1998 French film directed by Guillaume Nicloux

== Games ==
- OCTOPUS (fictional organisation), a fictional organisation in the From Russia with Love video game
- Name This Game or Octopus, an Atari 2600 video game
- Octopus, a 1981 Game & Watch game
- Octopus, a variant of British bulldog, a playground game
- In chess, a knight strongly placed in enemy territory; see glossary of chess

== Literature ==
- The Octopus: A Story of California, a 1901 novel by Frank Norris
- The Octopus (comics), a character in The Spirit
- The Octopus, a title used for one issue in 1939 by the pulp magazine The Western Raider
- The Octopus, a 1940 book by Elizabeth Dilling
- "The Octopus", a fictional article in Atlas Shrugged by Ayn Rand
- Octopus: Sam Israel, the Secret Market, and Wall Street's Wildest Con, a 2012 book by Guy Lawson

== Music ==
=== Artists ===
- Octopus (Belgian band) (1973–1980), a Belgian close-harmony group featuring English and Flemish members
- Octopus (English band), a 1969–1971 English band featuring the Griggs brothers: Paul Griggs and Nigel Griggs
- Octopus (Scottish band), a 1993–1997 Scottish Britpop band from Shotts, Lanarkshire
- The Octopus Project, an experimental band from Texas, also known as Octopus
- Oktopus or Alap Momin, a DJ, recording engineer and member of hip-hop group Dalek

=== Albums ===
- Octopus (Gentle Giant album) (1972)
- Octopus (The Human League album) (1995)
- Octopus (The Bees album) (2007)
- The Octopus (album), a 2011 album by English rock band Amplifier
- Í Hakanum/Octopus or Octopus, a 1980 album by Icelandic band Mezzoforte
- Octopus: The Best of Syd Barrett (1992)
- Octopuss, a 1983 album by Cozy Powell
- Octopus (Kris Davis and Craig Taborn album) (2018)

=== Songs ===
- "Octopus" (Syd Barrett song) (1969)
- "Octopus" (Bloc Party song) (2012)
- "Octopus", a 1961 song by singer-songwriter Billie Jean Horton
- "Octopus", a song by Icelandic band Mezzoforte from Í Hakanum/Octopus (1980)
- "Octopus", a 1979 song by British punk band The Freshies

== Computing and technology ==
- OCTOPUS (network), an early computer network at Lawrence Livermore National Laboratory
- Octopus (software), for quantum-mechanical calculations of molecules and solids

== Enterprises and organizations ==
- Octopus card, a Hong Kong stored value smart card launched in 1997
  - Octopus Cards Limited, the operator of Octopus card
  - Octopus Holdings Limited, holding company jointly owned by five major transport companies in Hong Kong
- Octopus Group, a British asset management company
  - Octopus Energy, a UK-based energy supply company
- Octopus Publishing Group, a British subsidiary of Lagardère Publishing, specialising in illustrated books
- Organisation for Counter Terrorist Operations (OCTOPUS), a counter terrorism paramilitary unit in Andhra Pradesh & Telangana, India

== Other uses ==
- Octopus (genus), a large genus of octopuses
- Octopus (ride), an amusement ride
- Octopus (yacht)
- Octopus, a spare scuba-diving regulator apparatus
- The Octopus, a news story written by Danny Casolaro

== See also ==
- Al the Octopus, mascot of the Detroit Red Wings
- Doctor Octopus, a character created in 1963 for Spider-Man comics
- Legend of the Octopus, a Detroit team tradition
- Octopodidae, a family containing the majority of known octopus species
- Octopodoidea, a superfamily of all known octopods except for the argonautoids and vampyromorphs
- Octopus as food
- "Octopus's Garden", a song by the English rock band the Beatles (1969)
- Octopussy (disambiguation)
- Paul the Octopus, octopus with a history of correctly predicting the results of major German international football matches
- Squid, type of marine cephalopod related to the Octopus
