= Pay as you go (transport) =

Fare collection method in public transport

Pay as you go, or PAYG, in the context of public transport, refers to a method of fare collection where the fare is only charged at or after usage, depending on the actual usage, instead of buying a ticket in advance. In such a case, the payment method itself, when validated, is the proof-of-payment, with the actual journey detail not yet known.

== How it works ==
When using pay as you go, it is not necessary to buy a ticket. Instead, the passenger simply taps their travel pass on and off, and the system will automatically charge the correct amount, without needing an actual physical ticket.

== History ==
Pay as you go ticketing has become possible since the existence of automated fare collection. Fares can be charged automatically from ticket barriers, instead of the earlier form of ticketing, where a prospective passenger must visit a ticket office to buy a ticket, which is valid for a number of specified rides on a specific network / route, or buy a ticket from the conductor on board.

Common stored value ticket was a ticket used on the MTR network in the 1980s and 1990s. Instead of being valid for a single or a number of rides, the ticket was sold at a value, where the fare was deducted after each ride, and recycled by the ticket barrier when it goes out of value. This was a predecessor to stored value cards, developed to be a more durable replacement of magnetic tickets.

Upass in South Korea was the first commercial-used RF card for transportation in the world (first used in June 1996)¹, followed by Octopus card in Hong Kong, which replaced the common stored value tickets. Unlike the common stored value ticket, these stored value cards operate on RFID and can be topped up and reused.

Stored value transport cards are specific to each region, for example, Octopus cards can only be used in Hong Kong, while Oyster cards can only be used in London and a limited surroundings. Although it's a one-time purchase for residents, visitors still need to buy a card specific to the region, and it can be hard to get any remaining value back after leaving.

During the 2010s, public transport providers start to develop contactless payment as an alternative to stored value card. Contactless payment does not require a passenger to buy a stored value card and prepaid credit into it, instead, it is linked to the account specified by the payment method, for example, a credit card or a debit card, and any cards / devices in the global payment network, such as Mastercard, can be used for payment.

== Medium of payment ==
Pay as you go systems have been implemented using the following payment methods:

- Cash, by using a farebox on entry
- Stored value cards, for example, Octopus card, Oyster card, or OV-chipkaart
- Contactless bank cards and mobile devices, for example CPAY in London
- Mobile QR wallets, for example, the transport code functionality on Alipay
