= Transfer (public transport) =

Act of changing between public vehicles

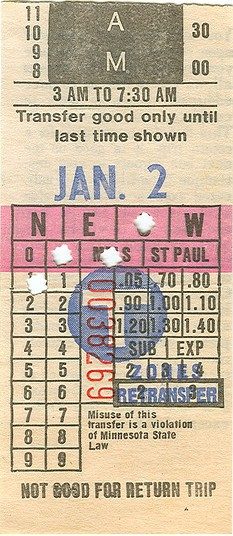
Bus transfer ticket, Minneapolis, Ca 1990

A transfer or interchange in the context of public transport refers to the act where a passenger alights a public transport vehicle and boards another public transport vehicle.

== Types of transfers ==
=== Same stop transfer ===
The simplest form of transfer is alighting a vehicle at a stop, and board another vehicle at the same stop.

=== In-station transfer ===
Some transfers require you to alight at a stop, and board another vehicle at a different stop (platform) in the same station.

=== Out-of-station transfer ===
An out-of-station transfer, or out-of-station interchange (OSI) refers to any change of public transport vehicles which require you to exit the station and enter another one, possibly at the street level in between. Such transfers can deter people from using it if they are not familiar with the area, or may have fare implications.

== Ticketing ==
On pay-per-ride networks, the fare can be a deterrent if a transfer is required.

A free or discounted transfer can be implemented by having both vehicles stop within the same fare control area, by issuing the rider a special ticket (also called a "free transfer") or by using an electronic smartcard system programmed to allow such transfers.

=== Fare control area ===
A free or discounted transfer can be implemented by having vehicles stop within a special area, which do not allow access from the outside, and a free or reduced fare charged at that stop. An example is Shing Mun Tunnels Bus Interchange, which is a closed interchange station where only buses are permitted to stop and the area closed off, where the majority of routes do not charge passengers boarding there.

=== Transfer tickets ===
A transfer ticket allows the rider of a public transportation vehicle who pays for a single-trip fare to continue the trip on another bus or train. Depending on the network, there may or may not be an additional fee for the transfer. Historically, transfers may have been stamped or hole-punched with the time, date, and direction of travel to prevent their use for a return trip.

=== Network-wide timed ticket ===
In most networks in continental Europe, there are a variety of timed, zonal ticket available for travel across all transport modes, and some have even got away with traditional single tickets, with only timed tickets available. These tickets usually allow unlimited transfers between vehicles with no restrictions on the routes you can use, as long as you stay within the ticketed zones.

=== Off-vehicle fare collection ===
Some transport networks, especially metros, require passengers to buy a ticket or validate a payment method before boarding, which acts as a proof-of-payment good for travel in the whole network, regardless of any transfers.

=== Pay as you go ===
In a pay as you go system, the fare to be charged is calculated automatically after travel, therefore, arbitrary transfer rules, including free transfers, can be coded in the system.

For example, on London Buses, if you board a bus / tram and pay with the same payment method (Oyster card, contactless payment card or device) within one hour after a fare-deducting journey, no further fare will be charged for any subsequent bus and tram journeys within that hour.
