= Octopus Holdings Limited =

Hong Kong holding company

- Company type: Joint venture
- Founded: Hong Kong, (2005)
- Headquarters: Hong Kong
- Key people: Sunny Cheung Yiu-tong, CEO
- Products: Octopus card
- Website: http://www.octopus.com.hk

Octopus Holdings Limited (Chinese: 八達通控股公司) is a holding company based in Hong Kong jointly owned by five major transport companies in the city. Its subsidiaries, which are all wholly owned, operate the various functions of the Octopus card in both its commercial and non-commercial usage. In 2006, the company gained international recognition by winning the Chairman's Award of the World Information Technology and Services Alliance's 2006 Global IT Excellence Award for the Octopus card system.

In January 2021, Bravo Transport, parent company of operators Citybus and New World First Bus, sold most of its stake in Octopus Holdings Limited to MTR Corporation, and the small remainder to another company.

== Company restructure ==
Prompted by the business expansion of the Octopus card, Octopus Holdings Limited was formed in 2005 after a company restructure of Octopus card operator Octopus Cards Limited. The Octopus card is used by card holders as an electronic payment system, and as such, the Octopus card system is considered a commercial business and is regulated by the Hong Kong Monetary Authority. The non-commercial businesses of the company, such as the consumer rewards program, consumer market research, and investment holdings, on the other hand, are not subjected to such regulations. The company restructure placed Octopus Cards Limited as a subsidiary of Octopus Holdings Limited, while the non-payment businesses of the company were placed under other subsidiaries, such that its payment businesses are independent of its non-payment businesses. Additionally, Octopus Holdings Limited has also expanded the use of the Octopus card system internationally, operating its businesses outside Hong Kong under a subsidiary.

== Subsidiaries ==
There are five wholly owned subsidiaries of Octopus Holdings Limited.

- Octopus Cards Limited operates the Octopus card in Hong Kong as an electronic payment system.
- Octopus Rewards Limited operates and develops Octopus Rewards, a consumer rewards programme for Octopus card customers.
- Octopus International Projects Limited provides international consultancy services for automatic fare collection systems.
- Octopus Investments Limited is an investment holding company.
- Octopus China Investments Limited is an investment holding company for China-related projects.

== Shareholding ==
As of 2007, Octopus Holdings Limited is a joint-venture business owned by five transport companies in Hong Kong; 57.4% by the MTR Corporation, 22.1% by the Kowloon-Canton Railway Corporation, 12.4% by Kowloon Motor Bus, 5% by Citybus, and 3.1% by New World First Bus. Since the Government of Hong Kong owns 76.8% of the MTR Corporation (as of 31 December 2009) and wholly owns the Kowloon-Canton Railway Corporation, it is the biggest effective shareholder of Octopus Holdings Limited.

== Personal data controversy ==
Chief executive Prudence Chan was under pressure to resign for having made inconsistent disclosures about the sale of personal data by one or more Octopus subsidiaries. Before a Legislative Council's finance affairs panel meeting, legislators from all parties accused her of attempting to mislead the public, thus precipitating a crisis of confidence in the company, and putting the company into disrepute.
