= Octopus card =

Stored value smart card in Hong Kong

Octopus card 八達通
- Adult version of the Octopus card since 2017
- Location: Hong Kong
- Launched: 1 September 1997; 29 years ago
- Technology: FeliCa (Type-F) (Mainly Used); HCE ISO/IEC 14443 (Type-A) (Designed for Google Wallet on Android); NFC
- Operator: Octopus Cards Limited
- Currency: HKD (HK$3,000 maximum load)
- Stored-value: Pay as you go
- Auto recharge: Automatic Add Value Service (through credit cards or FPS)
- Validity: MTR, MTR Light Rail; Hong Kong Tramways, Peak Tram; MTR Bus, Park Island Transport, Discovery Bay Transit Services; Citybus, Kowloon Motor Bus, Long Win Bus, New Lantao Bus; Star Ferry, Sun Ferry, Coral Sea Ferry, Hong Kong & Kowloon Ferry, Fortune Ferry; Some taxis; Convenience stores, Supermarkets, Restaurants, Parking, Vending machines
- Website: octopus.com.hk

Octopus card
- Traditional Chinese: 八達通
- Simplified Chinese: 八达通
Transcriptions
Standard Mandarin
- Hanyu Pinyin: Bā dá tōng
Yue: Cantonese
- Yale Romanization: Baat daaht tūng
- Jyutping: Baat^{3} daat^{6} tung^{1}

The Octopus card (Chinese: 八達通; Jyutping: baat3 daat6 tung1, Cantonese) is a reusable contactless stored value smart card for making electronic payments in online or offline systems in Hong Kong. Launched in September 1997 to collect fares for the territory's public transport system, it has grown into a widely used system for transport and other retail transactions in Hong Kong. It is also used for purposes such as recording school attendance and permitting building access. As of 2016, the cards are used by 98 percent of the population of Hong Kong aged 15 to 64 and the system handles more than 14 million transactions, worth over HK$180 million, every day.

The Octopus card system was the world's second contactless smart card system, after the Korean Upass. It won the Chairman's Award at the World Information Technology and Services Alliance's 2006 Global IT Excellence Awards for, among other things, being the world's leading complex automatic fare collection and contactless smart card payment system. Its success led to the development of similar systems elsewhere, including Navigo card in Paris, Oyster card in London, Opal card in New South Wales, and NETS FlashPay and EZ-Link in Singapore.

== History ==
When Hong Kong's Mass Transit Railway (MTR) began operations in 1979, it used recirculating magnetic stripe cards as fare tickets. The Kowloon-Canton Railway (KCR) adopted the same magnetic cards in 1984. The Common Stored Value Ticket was a version that held a balance for use over multiple trips. In 1989, the Common Stored Value Ticket system was extended to Kowloon Motor Bus (KMB) buses providing a feeder service to MTR and KCR stations, and to Citybus. It was also extended to a limited number of non-transport applications, such as transactions and payments at photo booths and for fast food vouchers.

In 1993, MTR Corporation announced it would move to use contactless smart cards. In 1994 it partnered with four other major transit companies in Hong Kong, Kowloon-Canton Railway Corporation, Kowloon Motor Bus, Citybus, and Hongkong and Yaumati Ferry, to create a joint-venture business, then known as Creative Star Limited.

After three years of trials, the Octopus card was launched on 1 September 1997. Three million cards were issued in the first three months. The system's quick success was because MTR and KCR required all holders of Common Stored Value Tickets to replace them with Octopus cards within three months or have their tickets expire. Another reason was a coin shortage in Hong Kong in 1997. With the transfer of Hong Kong away from British rule, there was a belief that older Hong Kong coins embossed with Queen Elizabeth II's head would rise in value, so many people held on to them waiting for their value to increase.

The Octopus system was quickly adopted by other Creative Star partners. KMB reported that by 2000 most bus journeys were completed using an Octopus card. Boarding a bus in Hong Kong without using the Octopus card requires giving exact change, making it cumbersome compared to using the Octopus card. By November 1998, 4.6 million cards had been issued, and rising to 9 million by January 2002.

In 2000, the Hong Kong Monetary Authority granted a deposit-taking company licence to the operator. This increased the proportion of permitted non-transport–related Octopus card transactions from 15% of turnover to 50%. About HK$416 million was deposited in the Octopus system at any given time as of 2000.

On 6 November 2005, Octopus Cards Limited launched Octopus Rewards, a program that allows cardholders to earn rewards with participating merchants. Founding partners for the Octopus Rewards program included HSBC, UA Cinemas and Wellcome. The rewards are in the form of points, or reward dollars, stored on the card. The rate at which reward points are earned per dollar spent differs between merchants. Reward points can be redeemed as payment for purchases at partner merchants for at least HK$1 per reward dollar.

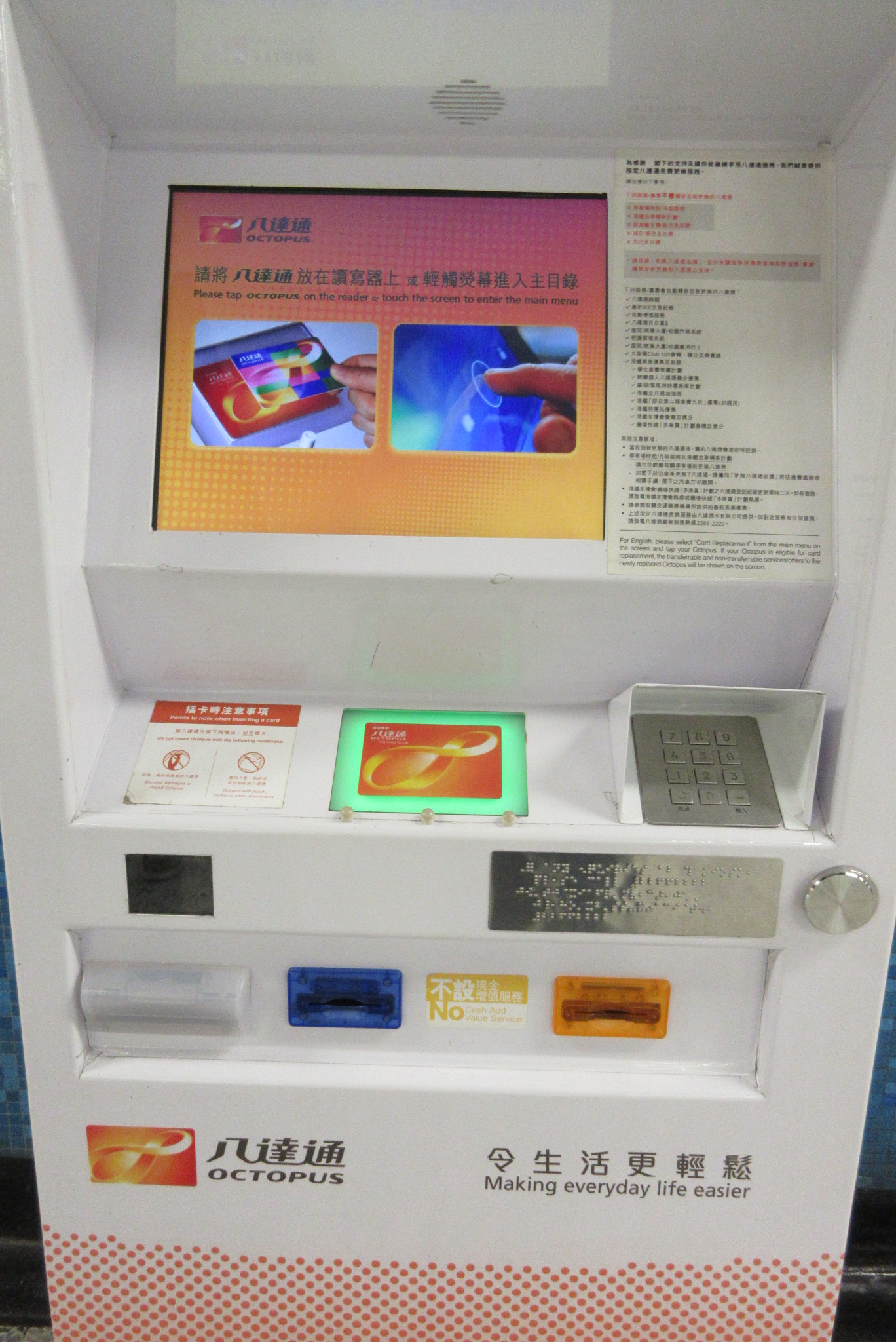
Octopus Service Point at MTR Lam Tin station

New cards with greater levels of security were launched in 2015. Holders of first generation cards could voluntarily replace their cards at an Octopus Service Point without charge. From January 2018, first generation cards started to become unusable.

In March 2024, Octopus Card Limited launched a version of the Octopus card with support for the China T-union network, allowing the holder to pay for public transport fares in 336 cities of Inland China. The card is topped up using HKD and automatically converted into RMB when taking non-Hong-Kong public transport.

== Etymologies and logo ==
The Cantonese name for the Octopus card, Baat Daaht Tùng (八達通), translates literally as "eight-arrived pass", where Baat Daaht may translate as "reaching everywhere". Less literally, the meaning is taken as the "go-everywhere pass". It was selected by the head of the MTR Corporation, the parent company of Octopus Cards Limited, in a naming competition in 1996. The number eight refers to the cardinal and ordinal directions, and the four-character idiom sei tùng baat daaht (Chinese: 四通八達), a common expression loosely translated as "reachable in all directions". Eight is also considered a lucky number in Chinese culture, and the phrase baat daaht can possibly be associated with the similar-sounding faat daaht, which means "getting wealthy" (發達) in Cantonese.

The English name Octopus card was also selected in the naming competition. It also references the number eight, since an octopus has eight tentacles. The logo used on the card features an infinity symbol.

== Card usage ==
How to use Octopus card in a ticket gate

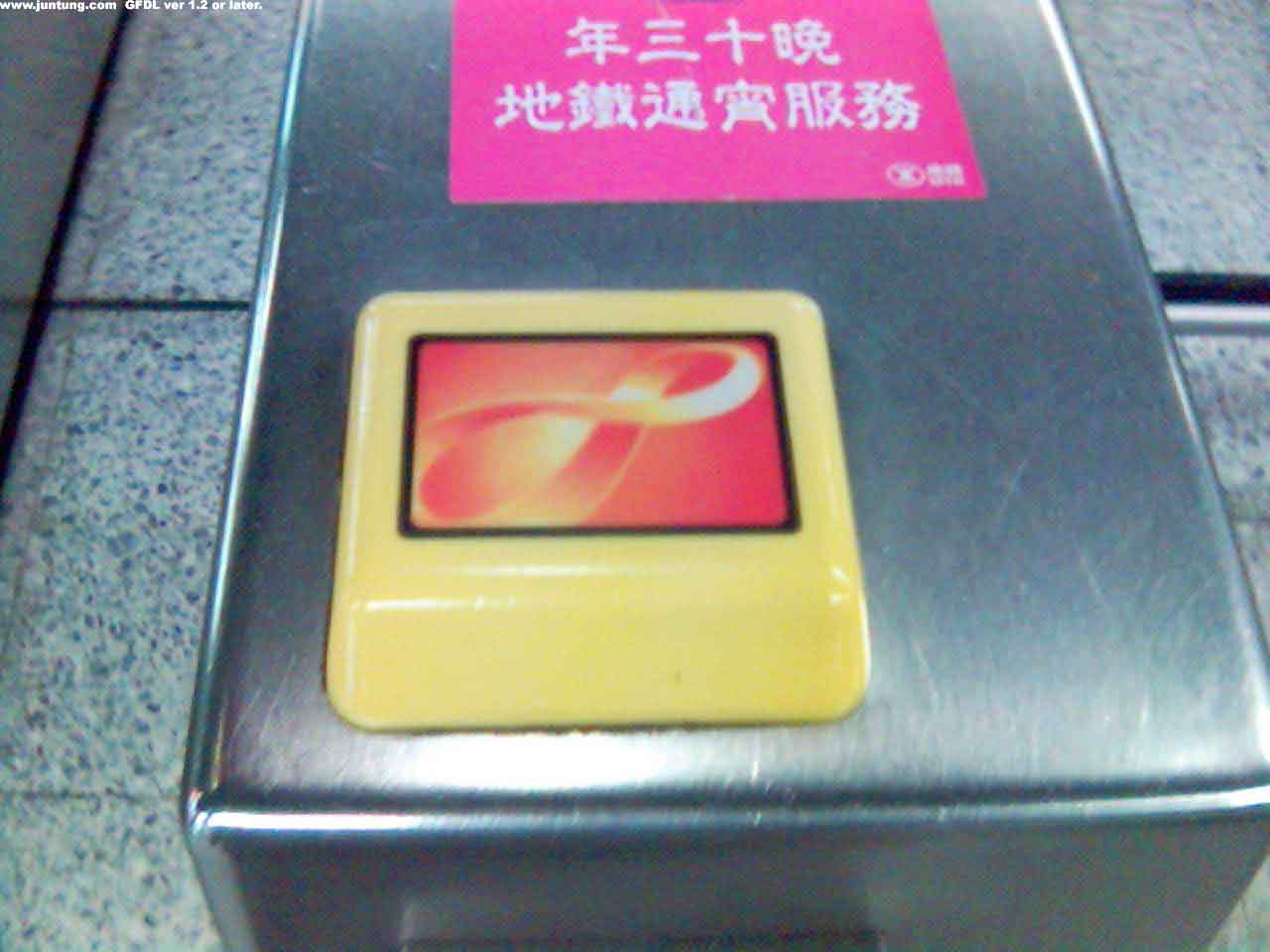
Octopus reader at an MTR ticket gate

The Octopus card was originally introduced for fare payment on the MTR; but usage quickly expanded to other retail businesses in Hong Kong. The card is now commonly used in most public transport, fast food restaurants, supermarkets, vending machines, convenience stores, photo booths, parking meters, car parks, and many other retails business where small payments are frequently made. Over 33 million Octopus cards are in circulation as of 2018, with the card being used by 99 per cent of Hong Kong residents.

Notable businesses that started accepting Octopus cards at an early stage included PARKnSHOP, Wellcome, Watsons, 7-Eleven, Starbucks, McDonald's, and Circle K. Between June 2003 and November 2004, the Hong Kong Government replaced its 17,000 parking meters with an Octopus card–operated system. Octopus card was then the only accepted form of payment until 2021 when new meters were introduced that accepted contactless payment, Faster Payment System and QR code payment.

Octopus cards also double as access control cards in buildings and for school administrative functions. At certain office buildings, residential buildings, and schools, use of an Octopus card is required for entry.

=== Payments ===
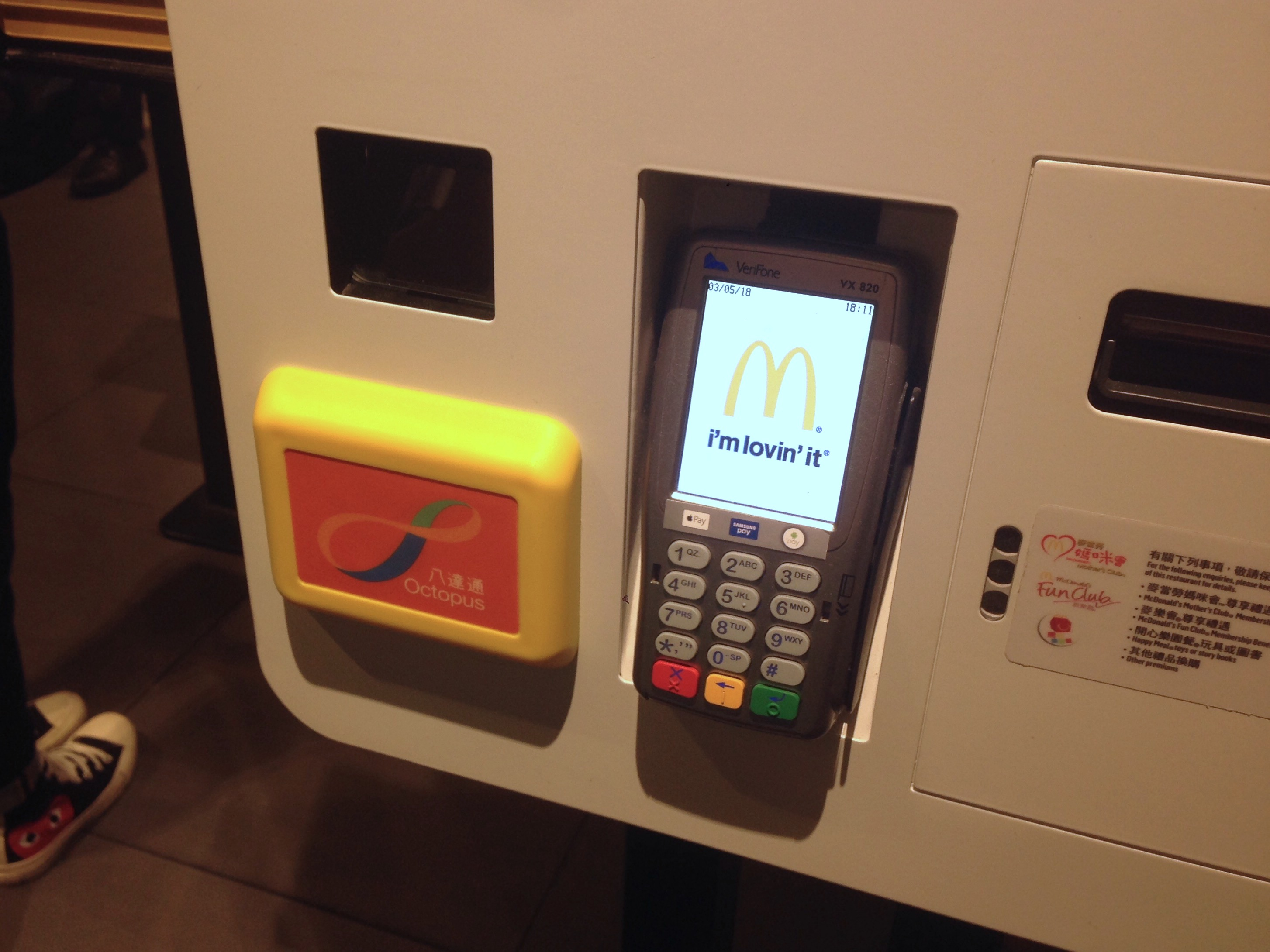
Octopus card reader of a self-payment kiosk at a McDonald's restaurant in Hong Kong

Payments are made by holding the card against or within a few centimetres of an Octopus card reader. The reader acknowledges payment by emitting a beep, and displaying the amount deducted and the remaining balance of the card. The standard transaction time for readers used for public transport is 0.3 seconds, and for retailers' card readers is 1 second.

==== Public transport ====
When using the MTR heavy rail system, each passenger's entry point is recorded and the appropriate fare based on distance travelled is deducted when they validate their cards again at the exit point.

The MTR usually charges less for journeys made using an Octopus card instead of conventional single-journey tickets. For example, the adult fare of a single journey from Chai Wan to Tung Chung is HK$25.7 with an Octopus card, and HK$28.5 with a single journey ticket. Other public transport operators also offer intermittent discounts for using Octopus cards on higher fares and round-trip transits on select routes.

==== Taxis ====
The first trial of using Octopus card readers in Hong Kong taxis started in June 2006 with the Yellow Taxi Group in the New Territories. It was reported on 30 October that eight of the twenty taxis participating in the trial had dropped out. Part of the reason was technical – drivers needed to return to the office every day for accounting. Most taxi drivers in Hong Kong are self-employed and prefer to account their profit and rent on a daily basis, while Octopus transferred money through a bank after one working day, so drivers could be left over a weekend or longer waiting for their account to be reconciled. Installation and service fees are also a concern.

Wong Yu-ting, the managing director of the Yellow Taxi Group, wanted retailers to offer discounts to Octopus taxi passengers, but the Transport Department objected as taxi fare discount is illegal in Hong Kong.

In March 2018, Octopus Cards Limited announced plans to re-enter the taxi payment market with a new mobile app for taxi drivers. The mobile app is able to receive funds by tapping the passenger's Octopus card to the device's Near-field communication (NFC) reader, or by allowing passengers to scan a QR code.

In October 2020, Octopus Cards Limited launched Octopus Mobile POS, a more compact version of the Octopus reader to help taxi drivers and small- and medium-sized retailers accept cashless payments. The new Octopus Mobile POS, that works with the mobile app, was opportune during the COVID-19 pandemic, as it helped provide merchants customers with peace of mind regarding potential virus transmission. By July 2021, over 15,000 taxi drivers had installed Octopus Mobile POS.

On April 1, 2026, the Hong Kong Government mandated that all licensed taxis must accept at least two forms of electronic payment options: one QR code-based method (such as WeChat Pay HK or AlipayHK) and one non-QR code method (such as an Octopus card or a credit card). In anticipation of the regulation, the number of taxi drivers registered to accept commercial Octopus payments exceeded 40,000 by the start of the mandate.

==== Outside Hong Kong ====
In collaboration with China UnionPay, Octopus Cards Limited introduced Octopus card usage to two Fairwood restaurants in Shenzhen in August 2006. In 2008, five Café de Coral locations in Shenzhen also started accepting Octopus. Value cannot be reloaded to Octopus cards in Shenzhen, but the Automatic Add Value Service is available to automatically deduct money value from a customer's credit card to reload an Octopus card. The two Fairwood restaurants in Shenzhen that were enabled for Octopus card payments are located at Luohu Commercial City and Shenzhen railway station. Shenzhen became the first city outside Hong Kong in which Octopus cards may be accepted as payment.

In Macau, the Octopus card was introduced in December 2006 when two Kentucky Fried Chicken restaurants in the territory adopted its usage as payment. Similar to its usage in Shenzhen, an Octopus card may not be reloaded in Macau, and the currency exchange rate between the Macanese pataca and the Hong Kong dollar when using an Octopus card is MOP1:HKD1. The two Kentucky Fried Chicken restaurants in Macau that adopted the Octopus card for payment are located at the Rua do Campo and the Sands Casino.

Shenzhen Tong cards are now widely used in Shenzhen instead, and a combined Shenzhen Tong – Hong Kong Octopus card is available, called the Hu Tong Xing, with RMB & HKD in different purses. The Macau Pass is now widely used in Macau.

Starting from 26 March 2024, Octopus card launched a new version, which can be used in mainland China and Macau through China T-Union.

=== Balance enquiries, reloading and refunds ===
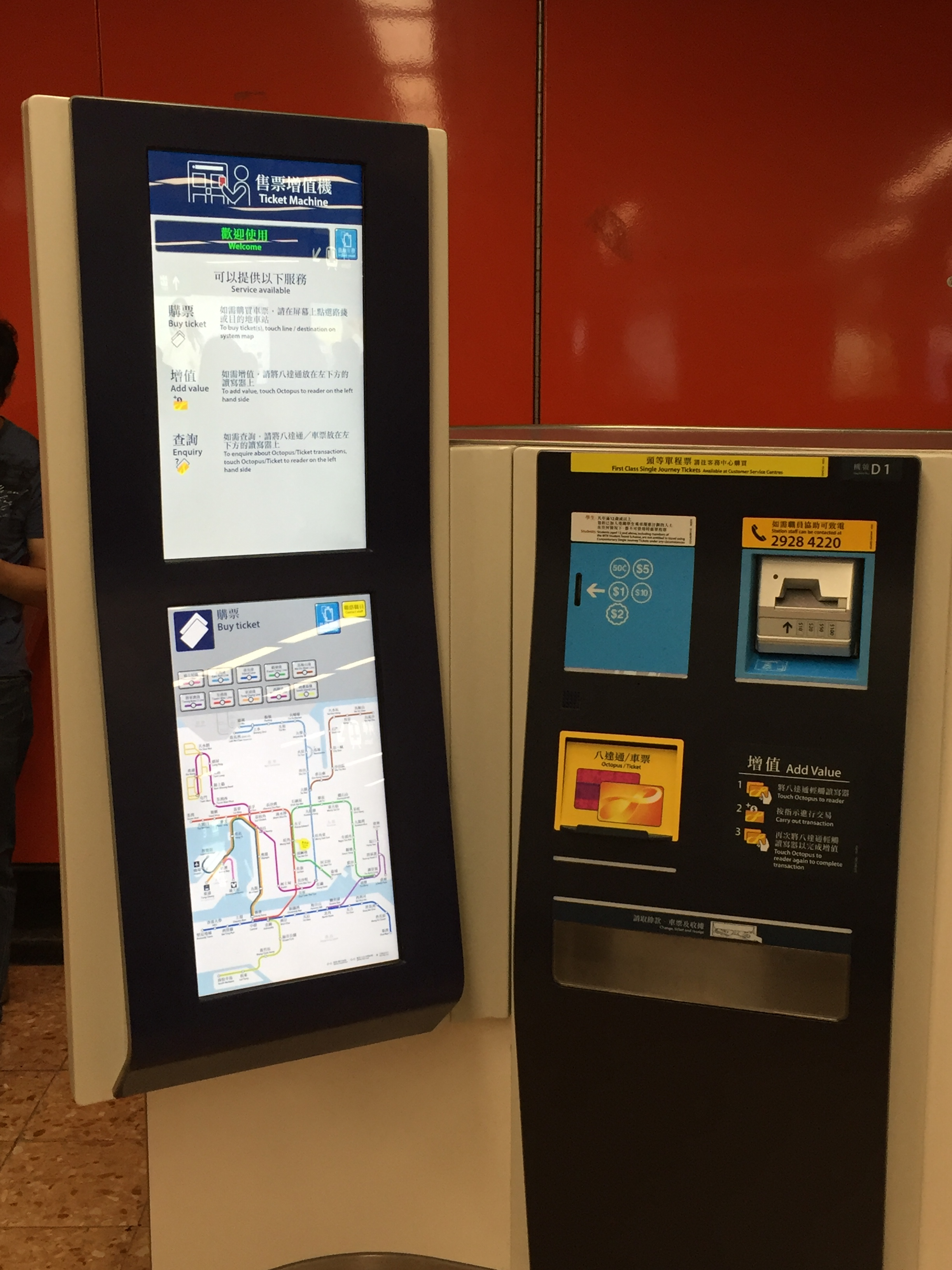
Octopus card enquiry and add value machine in Mong Kok station in 2017.

Spare coins can also be added on to Octopus cards at "Coin Carts", a vehicle operated by Hong Kong Monetary Authority.

== Types of cards ==
There are two main types of Octopus card (On-Loan and Sold), and two less common types (Airport Express Tourist and MTR Airport Staff).

=== Main types of cards ===
==== On-Loan cards ====
On-Loan cards are issued for use in day-to-day functions, primarily for fare payment in transport systems. They are further classified into Child, Adult, Elder, and Personalised categories, with the first three based on age and different amounts of fare concession. With the exception of the Personalised cards, On-Loan cards are anonymous; no personal information, bank account, or credit card details are stored on the card, and no identification is required for the purchase of these cards. If an owner loses a card, only the stored value and the deposit of the card are lost. On-Loan Octopus cards may be purchased at all MTR stations, the KMB Customer Service Centre, New World First Ferry (NWFF) Octopus Service Centres, and the New World First Bus (NWFB) Customer Service Centre. A student on-loan Octopus Card was initially issued, but was discontinued in 2005.

Types of On-Loan Octopus cards
Type	Colour	Cost and use
Adult	Gold (discontinued); Combined colors from all versions (discontinued); Black; Grey	The standard version of the Octopus card. This card is sold for HK$200 with an initial value of HK$150. This colour is also used for the logo of Octopus Cards Limited, the operator.
Child	Pink (discontinued); Sky Blue	Children aged between 3 and 11. This card is sold for HK$100 with an initial value of HK$50. Children's fares (usually half-price) are deducted where applicable.
Elder	Green	Only to be used by senior citizens of age 65 or above, where Elder's fares are deducted where applicable. If no elder fares are available, adult fares are deducted. This card is sold for HK$100 with an initial value of HK$50.
Personalised	Same as the adult version, with name of the holder (and a photo if requested) printed on the back	This Personalised card is available upon registration. This application cost for this card is HK$200 with an initial value of HK$130 and a handling charge of HK$20.: Registered students of Hong Kong's Education Bureau can apply for this card with "Student Status", and receive discounted fares on the MTR and selected routes on KMB; Eligible persons with disabilities, after Social Welfare Department approval, may apply for a Personalised Octopus with "Persons with Disabilities Status" at HK$50 deposit. Other fees are waived by MTR and Octopus; Above statuses have expiry date which can be checked at MTR enquiry machines. Holders may renew and extend their status period by application to MTR.
Student (discontinued)	Purple	For students attending secondary schools and universities. Discontinued in 2005 and replaced by the Personalised Octopus Card.

=== Samsung Pay ===
Since 14 December 2017, the cardless Octopus, named "Smart Octopus", is available with Samsung Pay, a mobile payment platform provided by Samsung. By using the phone's NFC function and magnetic secure transmission (MST) technology, users can tap their selected Samsung devices on Octopus readers, paying in a similar way as a normal physical Octopus cards.

Users can choose to transfer their card data from an existing anonymous On-Loan Adult or Elder Octopus to the Smart Octopus. All card value and reward points are transferred and held in the Samsung Pay app. The physical card is then deactivated and can no longer be used. Users can also choose to purchase a new Adult or Elder Smart Octopus in the app.

Smart Octopus provides features like instant transaction notification and in-app top-up function. In-app top-ups initially incurred a 2.5% handling fee but this fee was removed in June 2020 when support for Apple Pay was launched.

=== Apple Pay ===
Since 2 June 2020, Octopus cards can be added to Apple Pay. As Octopus cards use FeliCa technology, only Apple Watch 3, iPhone 8, and subsequent model are supported. Octopus for Tourists was launched in August 2020.

Users can choose to create a virtual Octopus card inside Apple Pay by topping up with their loaded credit cards, or to transfer data from an existing physical Octopus card. It supports Apple Pay's Express Transit function, which allows payments to be made from the iPhone or Apple Watch without needing to switch on the phone or authenticating the payment with Face ID, Touch ID, or password.

=== Huawei Pay ===
Since 9 December 2020, Octopus card can be added to Huawei Pay. But it can only be used on Huawei phones sold in Hong Kong, Macau and China

Users can download the Octopus app from Huawei AppGallery to purchase new Octopus cards or transfer physical Octopus cards. If users have a UnionPay credit card, they can also purchase new Octopus cards in Huawei Wallet.

=== Google Wallet ===
Starting from 28 April 2024, Google Wallet Octopus cards can be purchased through the Octopus App. Users can download the app through the Google Play Store or the Huawei AppGallery. The Mobile Octopus supports devices with Android 12 and above. However, only the Adult card can be added into Google Wallet.

== Technology ==
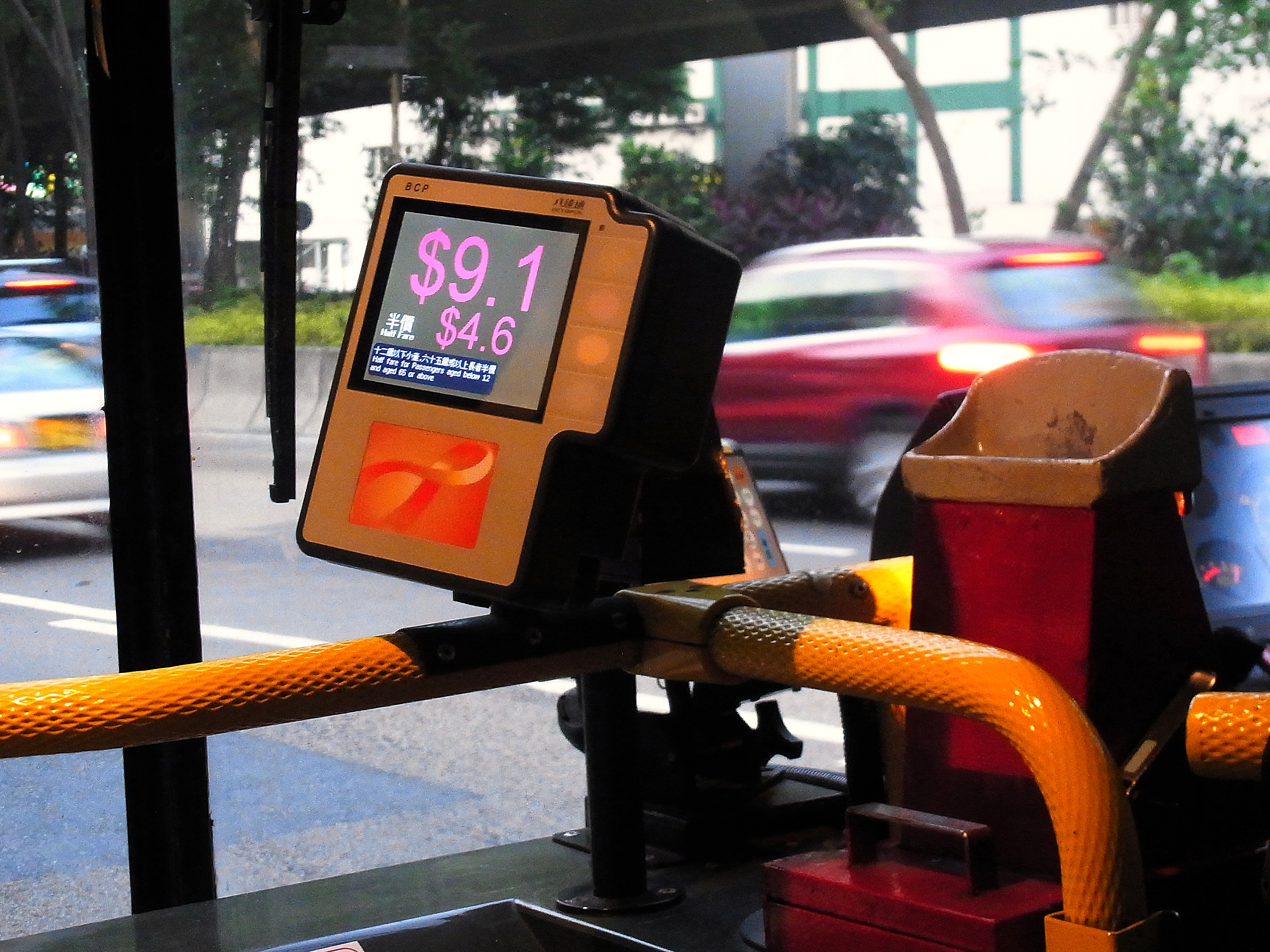
An Octopus Card reader installed on a bus operated by Kowloon Motor Bus Company

The Australia-based company ERG Group (now Vix Technology) was selected in 1994 to lead development of the Octopus project. It designed, built and installed the Octopus system. Operations, maintenance and development were undertaken by Octopus Cards Limited, and in 2005, it replaced the central transaction clearing house with its own system.

The Octopus card is the first major public transport system to use the Sony 13.56 MHz FeliCa radio frequency identification (RFID) chip. It is a contactless system, so users need only hold the card in close proximity to the reader. Data is transmitted at up to 212 kbit/s (the maximum speed for Sony FeliCa chips), compared to 9.6 kbit/s for other smart card systems like Mondex and Visa Cash. The card has a storage capacity of 1 to 64 kB, compared to 125 bytes provided by magnetic stripe cards.

Octopus pre-dates the ISO/IEC 14443 standards so uses a nonstandard RFID system. The operating range of the reader/writer is between 30 and 100 mm (1.2 and 3.9 in) depending on the model used.

Octopus is designed so that transactions are relayed for clearing on a store and forward basis, without any requirement for reader units to have realtime round-trip communications with a central database or computer. The stored data may be transmitted after hours, or in the case of offline mobile readers, may be retrieved by a hand held device, for example a Pocket PC.

In practice, different data collection mechanisms are used by different transport operators, depending on the nature of their business. The MTR equips its stations with local area networks that connect the components that deal with Octopus cards – turnstiles, Add Value Machines, value-checking machines and customer service terminals. Transactions from these stations are relayed to the MTR's Kowloon Bay headquarters through a Frame Relay wide area network, and then on to the central clearing house system (CCHS). Similar arrangements are in place for retailers such as 7-Eleven. Handheld devices are used to scan offline mobile readers, including those installed on minibuses. Buses either use handheld devices or a wireless system, depending on operator.

=== Security ===
The Octopus card uses encryption for all airborne communication and performs mutual authentication between the card and reader based on the ISO 9798-2 three-pass mutual authentication protocol. In other words, data communications are only established when the card and reader have mutually authenticated based on a shared secret access key. This means that the security of the Octopus card system would be jeopardized should the access key be exposed. A stolen Octopus card reader could be used with stolen Octopus software, for example, to add value (up to HK$3,000) to any Octopus card without authorization. Nevertheless, as of 2003, the Octopus card and system had never been hacked.

Octopus card readers include a fail-safe that prevents them from initiating a transaction when more than one card is detected at a time. On 11 February 2009, Sing Tao Daily reported that the fail-safe has been abused for fare evasion through the railway station turnstile. Passengers were stacking four or more cards on the reader before breaking through the turnstile, deliberately triggering the fail-safe to avoid deduction of credit from their cards. If challenged they could blame a malfunction and present an Octopus card with a record of an unsuccessful transaction.

== Operator ==
The Octopus card system is owned and operated by Octopus Cards Limited, a wholly owned subsidiary of Octopus Holdings Limited. Founded as Creative Star Limited in 1994, it was renamed Octopus Cards Limited in 2002.

In January 2001, the shares of Hongkong and Yaumati Ferry were transferred to New World First Bus and New World First Ferry. In the same year, together with MTR Corporation, the company changed from non-profit making status to a profit making enterprise.

Due to the expansion of the company's businesses, Octopus Holdings Limited was established in 2005 with Octopus Cards Limited restructured as a subsidiary. Being a payment business, Octopus Cards Limited is regulated by the Hong Kong Monetary Authority. Octopus' non-payment businesses are not subjected to such regulation and are operated by other subsidiaries of Octopus Holdings Limited.

As of 2007, Octopus Holdings Limited was a joint-venture business owned by five transport companies in Hong Kong; 57.4% by the MTR Corporation, 22.1% by the Kowloon-Canton Railway Corporation, 12.4% by Kowloon Motor Bus, 5% by Citybus, and 3.1% by New World First Bus. The Government of Hong Kong owns 76.54% of the MTR Corporation (as of 31 December 2005) and wholly owns the Kowloon-Canton Railway Corporation, so is the biggest effective shareholder of Octopus Holdings Limited, and of Octopus Cards Limited.

== Awards ==
The Octopus card is recognised internationally. It won the Chairman's Award at the World Information Technology and Services Alliance's 2006 Global IT Excellence Awards for being the world's leading complex automatic fare collection and contactless smartcard payment system, and for innovative use of technology.

== Issues ==
=== EPS add-value glitch ===
In February 2007 it was found that when customers added value to their cards at self-service add-value points in MTR and Light rail stations, their bank accounts were debited even if the transactions had been cancelled. Octopus Cards Limited claimed that the fault was due to an upgrade of communication systems. Initially, two cases were reported. The company then announced that use Electronic Payment Services (EPS) at add-value service points would be suspended until further notice, and that it had started an investigation into the reasons for the problem.

On 27 July 2007 it was announced that faulty transactions had been traced back to 2000, and that a total of 3.7 million Hong Kong dollars had been wrongly deducted in 15,270 cases. The company reported that there might be cases prior to 2000, but that only the past seven years’ transactions were stored. The company stated it would co-operate with banks and EPS Company Limited, operator of Electronic Payment Services, to contact customers involved and arrange a refund within ten weeks.

On 21 December 2007 the company announced it would permanently cease all transactions using EPS because it could not guarantee such problems would not occur again.

=== Privacy abuse ===
On 15 July 2010, a former employee of the CIGNA insurance company claimed CIGNA purchased records for 2.4 million Octopus users. On 20 July, Octopus acknowledged selling customers' personal details to CIGNA and Card Protection Plan Limited, and started an internal review of their data practices. Octopus Holdings made 44 million Hong Kong dollars ($5.7M USD) over 4.5 years. Roderick Woo Bun, Hong Kong's Privacy Commissioner for Personal Data, gave radio interviews and called for transparent investigation, but his term expired at the end of July 2010. Allan Chiang Yam-wang was announced as the incoming Privacy Commissioner. This news was met with protests and international outrage, due to his prior history of privacy invasions involving cameras used to spy on employees at the Post Office, and disclosing hundreds of job applicants' personal data to corporations. Outgoing Privacy Commissioner Woo pledged to finish a preliminary report on the Octopus privacy abuse before his term ended, and called for a new law making it a criminal offence for companies to sell personal data.

=== Technology ===
As NFC and cardless payment are more popular in mainland China, some question the slow technology development of Octopus company. Among these commentaries, some suggest market monopoly and government attitude to Octopus are the contributing factor, as the social transportation subsidies are solely through the Octopus system. Octopus CEO Sunny Cheung stated that new technology would be launched in short period of time, such as QR code payment, integration of Octopus card with Samsung Pay and peer-to-peer lending.

== See also ==
- Digital currency
- List of public transport smart cards
