= Xiangxicun station =

Metro station in Shenzhen, Guangdong, China

Coordinates: 22°32′46.22″N 114°7′56.18″E

Xiangxicun 向西村
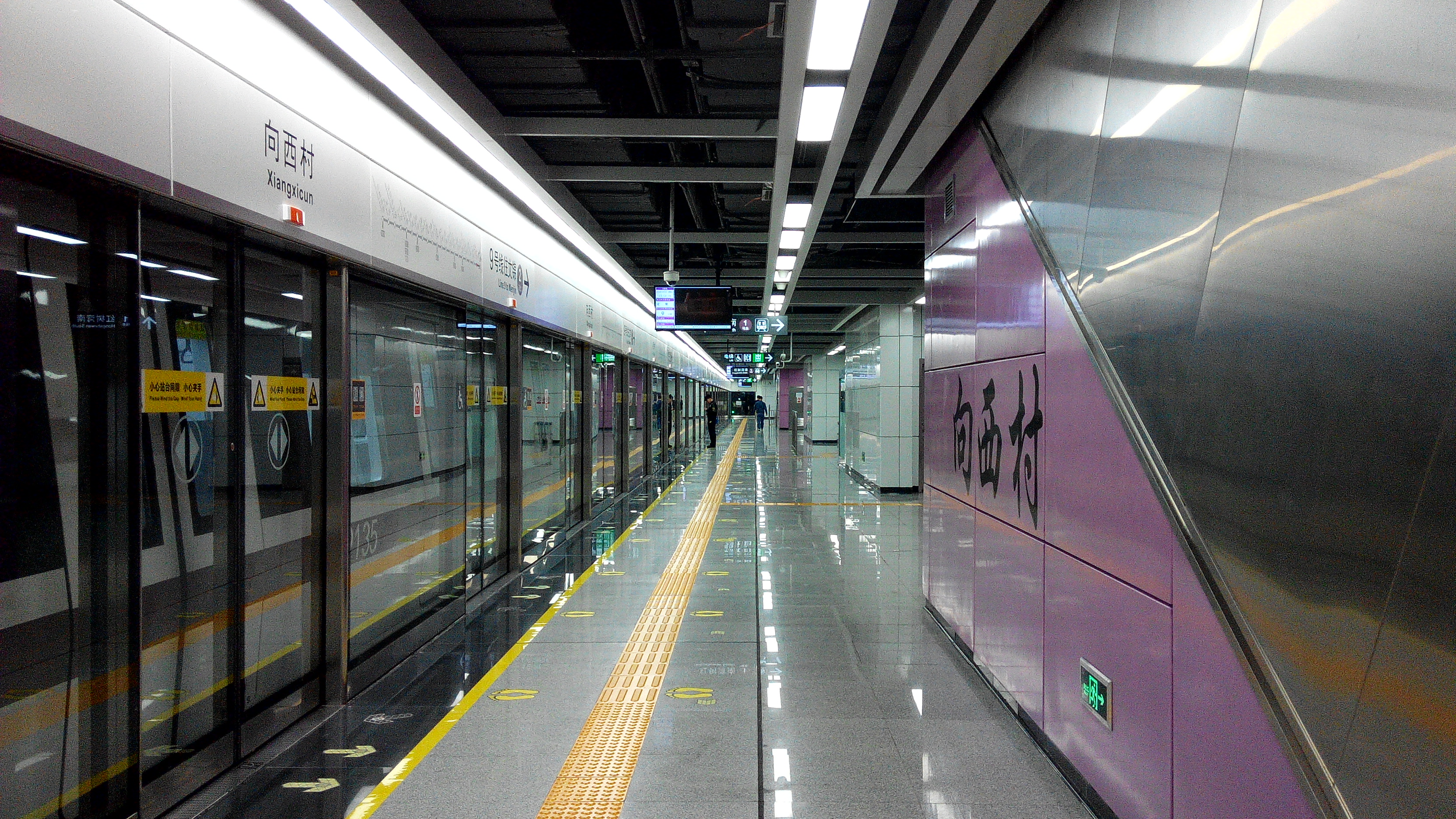

General information
- Location: Luohu District, Shenzhen, Guangdong; China
- Operator: SZMC (Shenzhen Metro Group)
- Line: Line 9
- Platforms: 2

History
- Opened: 28 October 2016

Services
Preceding station	Shenzhen Metro	Following station
Wenjin Terminus	Line 9	Renmin South towards Qianwan
Location

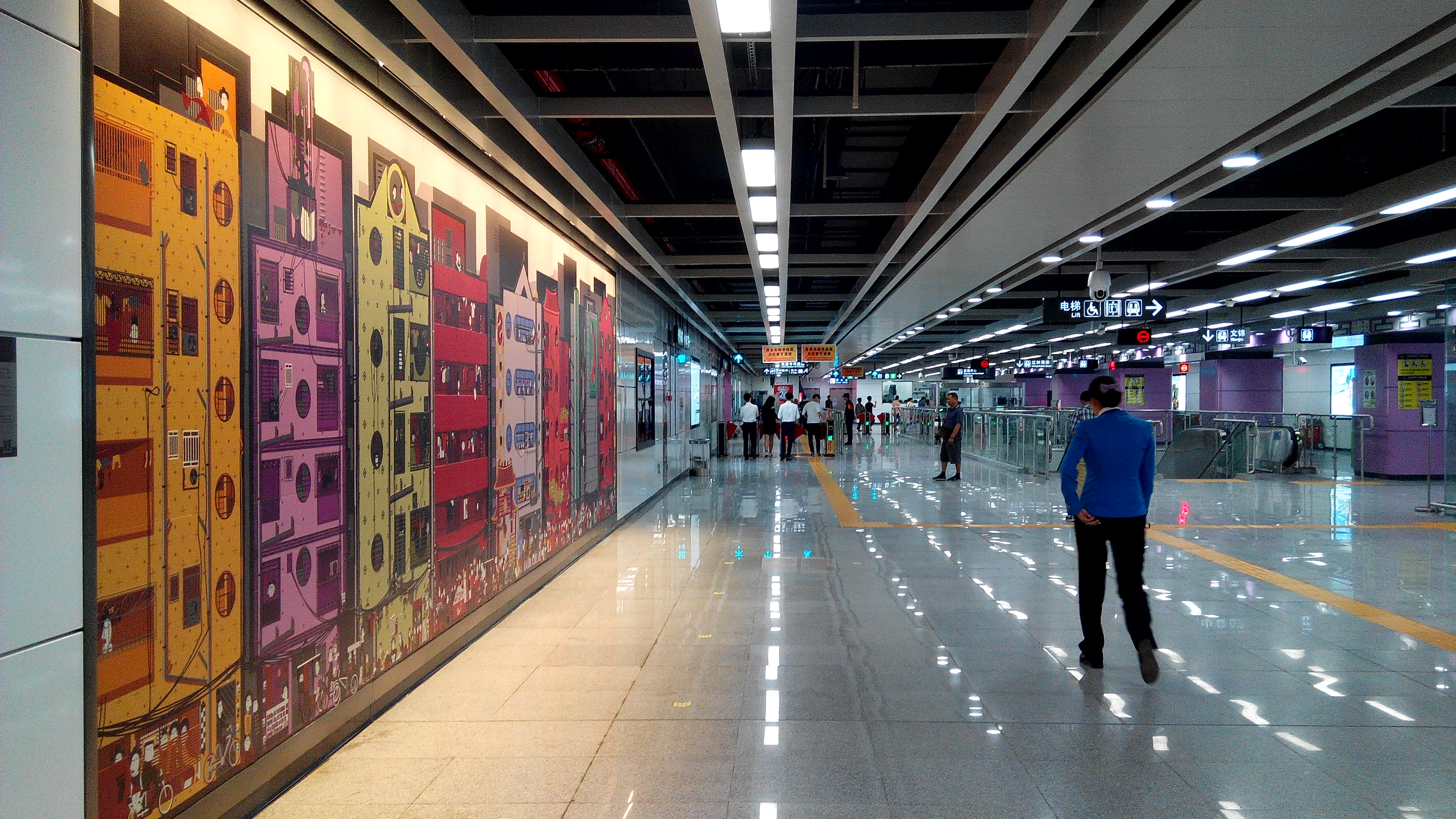
Concourse

Xiangxicun station (Chinese: 向西村站; pinyin: Xiàngxī Cūn Zhàn; Jyutping: hoeng3 sai1 cyun1 zaam6) is a metro station of Shenzhen Metro Line 9. It opened on 28 October 2016. This station is located under the intersection of Chunfeng Road and Dongmen South Road.

== Station layout ==
G	-	Exit
B1F; Concourse	Lobby	Customer Service, Shops, Vending machines, ATMs
B2F; Upper Platform	Side platform, doors will open on the right
B2F; Upper Platform	Platform 1	← Line 9 towards Qianwan (Renmin South)
B3F; Lower Platform	Side platform, doors will open on the left
B3F; Lower Platform	Platform 2	→ Line 9 towards Wenjin (Terminus) →

== Exits ==
Exit		Destination
Exit A	A1	Dongmen South Road (N), Chunfeng Road (E), Ruipeng Building
Exit A	A2	Dongmen South Road (S), Chunfeng Road (E)
Exit B		Chunfeng Road (E), Kaiyue Huating, Yunjing Haoyuan
Exit C		Chunfeng Road (W), Jinse Duhui, Xiangxi Garden
Exit D	D1	Dongmen South Road (N), Baofeng Building
Exit D	D2	Dongmen South Road (S), Guangfa Building
