= Renmin South station =

Metro station in Shenzhen, Guangdong province, China

Coordinates: 22°32′30.67″N 114°7′28.06″E

Renmin South 人民南
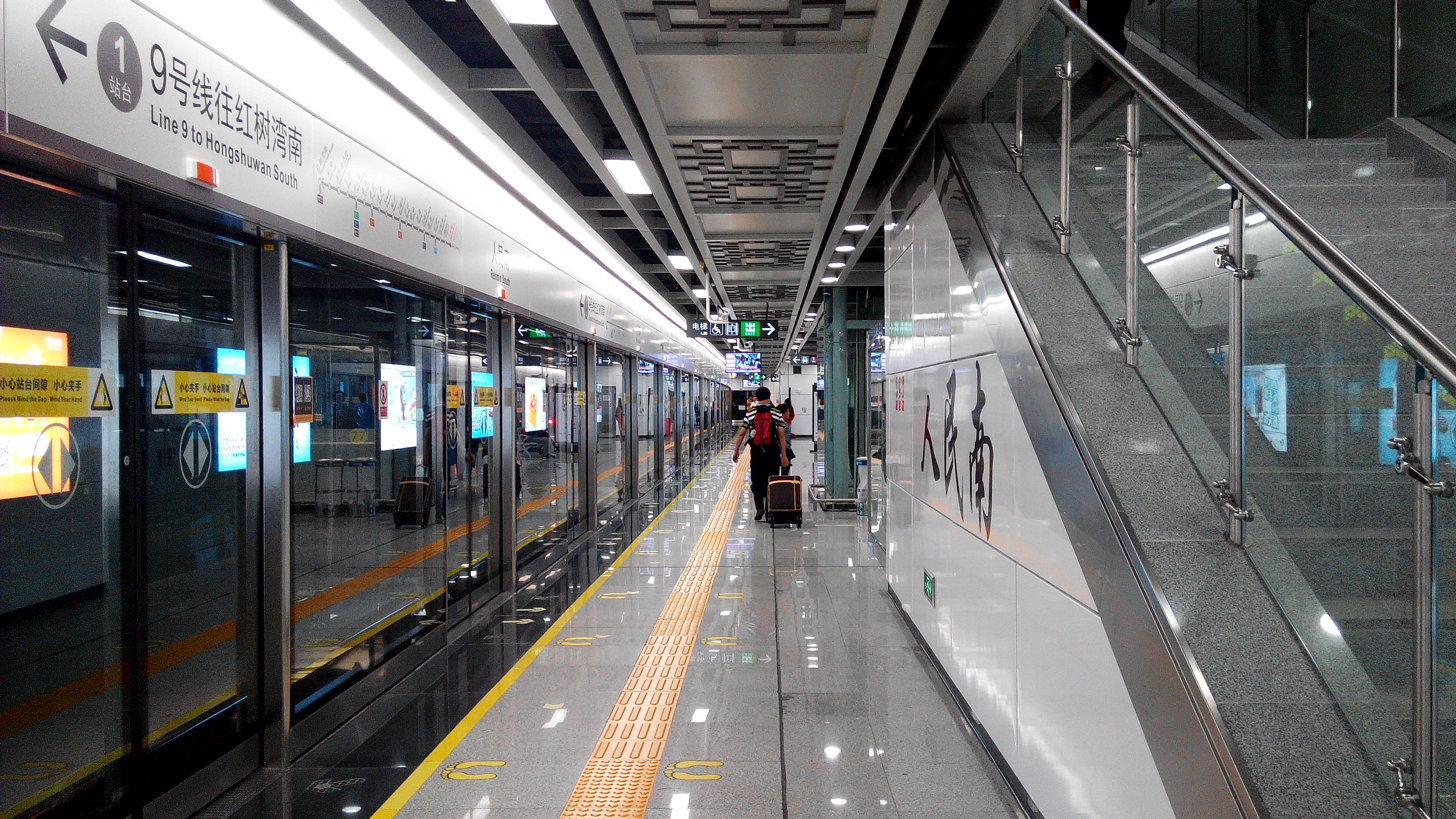

General information
- Location: Luohu District, Shenzhen, Guangdong; China
- Operated by: SZMC (Shenzhen Metro Group)
- Line: Line 9
- Platforms: 2 (1 island platform)
- Tracks: 2
- Connections: Line 1 (Luohu); Shenzhen; East Rail line (Lo Wu)

History
- Opened: 28 October 2016; 9 years ago

Services
Preceding station	Shenzhen Metro	Following station
Xiangxicun towards Wenjin	Line 9	Ludancun towards Qianwan
Out-of-station interchange
Guomao towards Airport East	Line 1 transfer at Luohu	Terminus
Across mainland China–Hong Kong boundary
Preceding station	MTR	Following station
Sheung Shui towards Admiralty	East Rail line transfer at Lo Wu	Terminus
Route map
Location

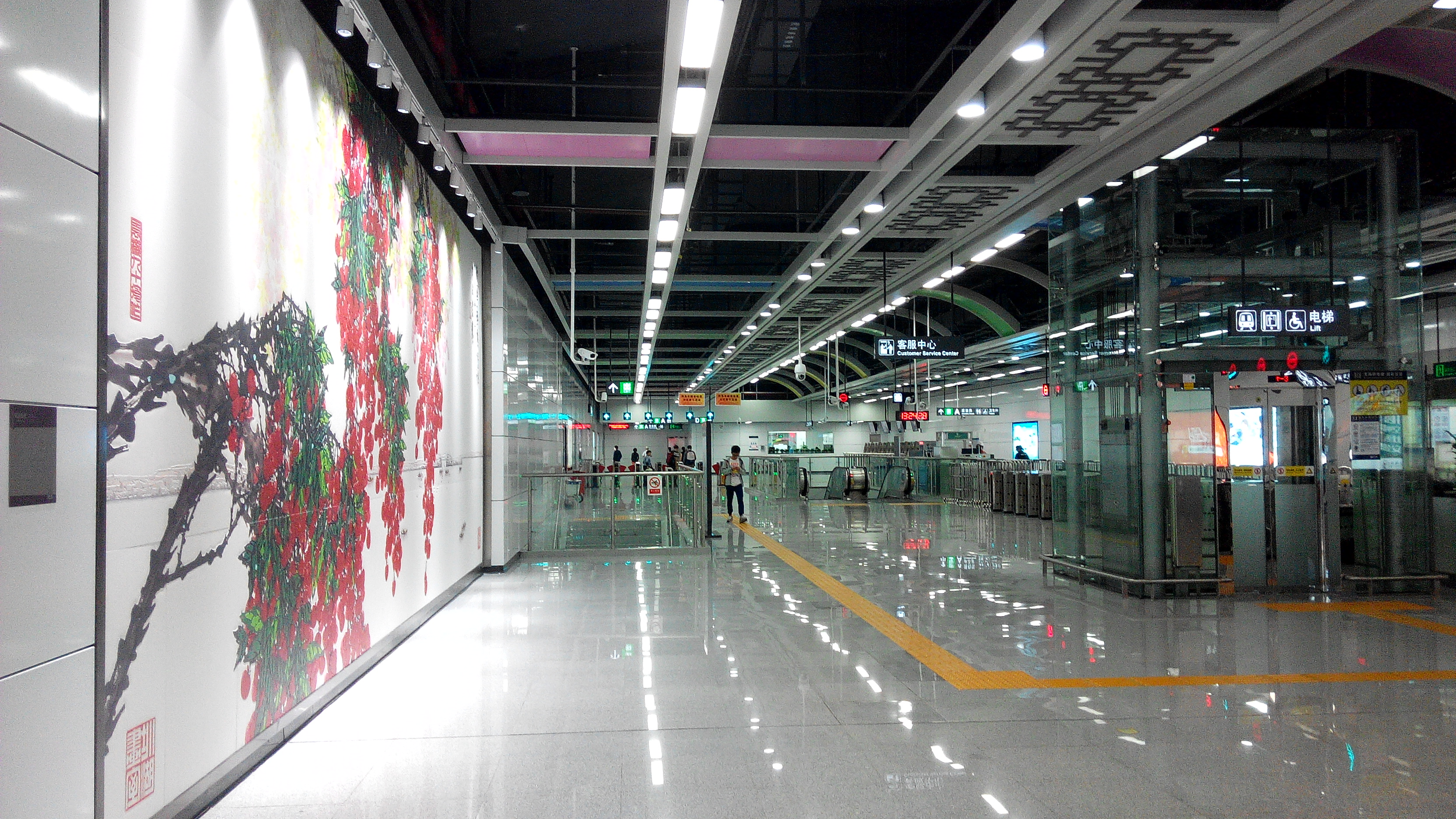
Concourse

Renmin South station (Chinese: 人民南站; pinyin: Rénmín Nán Zhàn; Jyutping: jan4 man4 naam4 zaam6) is a metro station of Shenzhen Metro Line 9. It opened on 28 October 2016. This station is located under the intersection of Renmin South Road and Chunfeng Road.

== Station layout ==
G	Street level	Exits
B1F; Concourse	Lobby	Customer Service, Shops, Vending machines, ATMs
B2F; Platforms	Platform 1	← Line 9 towards Qianwan (Ludancun South)
B2F; Platforms	Island platform, doors will open on the left
B2F; Platforms	Platform 2	→ Line 9 towards Wenjin (Xiangxicun) →

== Exits ==
Exit		Destination
Exit A	A1	Jianshe Road (E), Dunxin Building, Shenzhen railway station
Exit A	A2	Jianshe Road (E), Dexing Building (W), Dexing Tea World
Exit B		Renmin South Road (W), Guangdong Bank Building, Luohucun, Dexing Tea World, Real Estate Building, Luohu station Exit E2
Exit C		Renmin South Road (W), Chunfeng Road
Exit D		Jianshe Road (E), Chunfeng Road
