= World Congress on Information Technology (2019) =

Information and communication technology event

WCIT 2019
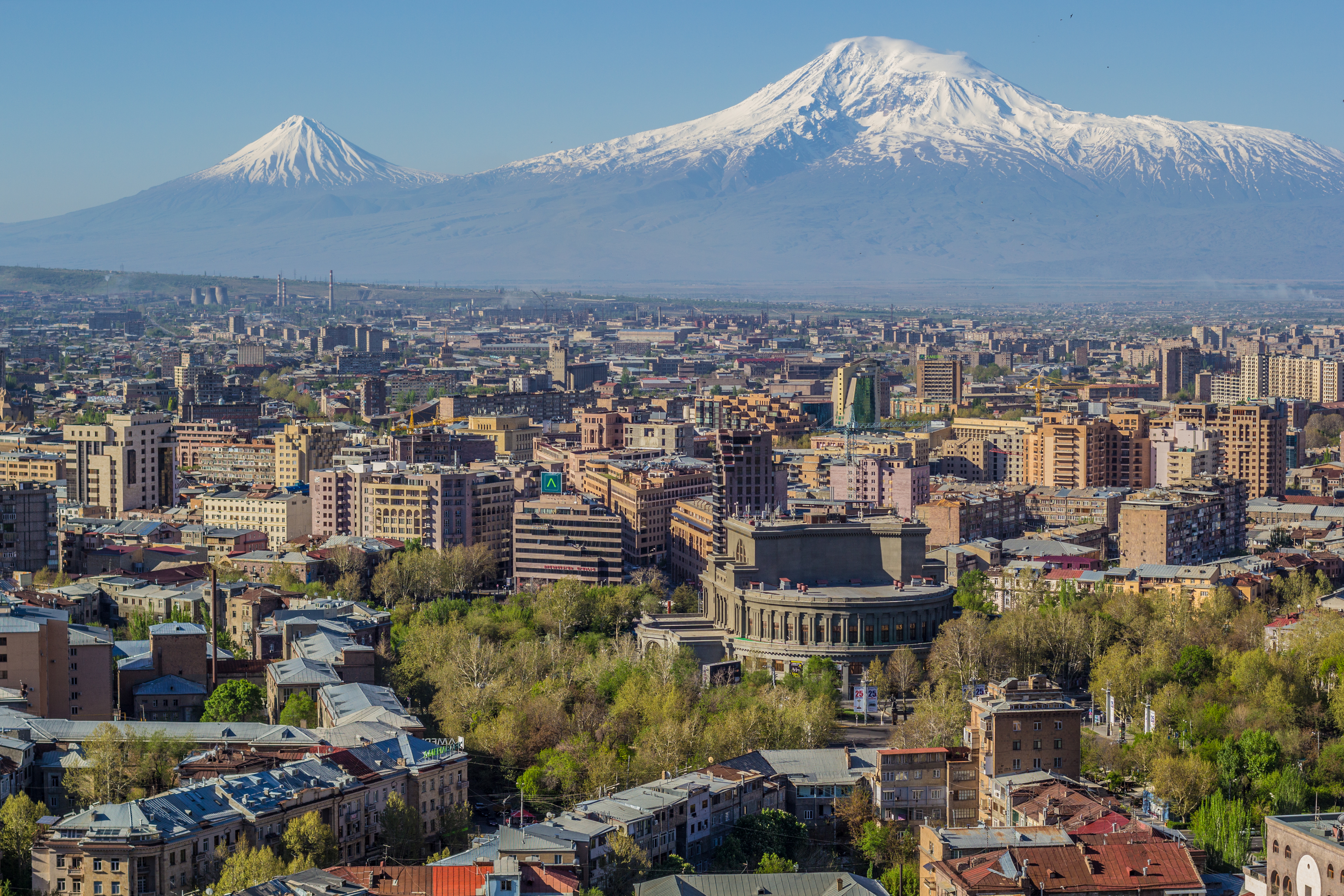
- View of Yerevan, Armenia
- Date: October 6–9, 2019
- Venue: Karen Demirchyan Sports and Concerts Complex
- Location: Yerevan, Armenia
- Theme: The Power of Decentralization: Promise and Peril
- Website: www.wcit2019.org

The World Congress On Information Technology (WCIT) 2019 is an information and communications technology (ICT) event which took place from October 6 to 9, 2019 in Yerevan, Armenia. The 23rd World Congress on IT featured discussions related to the evolution of the Digital Age. It included sessions on topics ranging from artificial intelligence, virtual reality, smart cities to cybersecurity, climate change, and more.

The 2019 World Congress had over 2000 delegates from 70 countries, with over 31 sponsoring organizations.

== Overview ==
The Congress has been organized since 1978 by the World Information Technology and Services Alliance (WITSA) and takes place every two years in different countries - since 2017 annually.

=== WCIT 2019 events and programs ===
==== Sunday, October 6th ====
Pre-Opening Celebration: World's First AI Concert on Republic Square of Yerevan, Armenia, conductor Sergey Smbatyan and special guest Armin Van Buuren

==== Monday, October 7th ====
Substantive Sessions WCIT 2019 Keynote Address

==== Tuesday, October 8th ====
Substantive Sessions Ministerial Session

==== Wednesday, October 9th ====
Substantive Sessions Genomics

== Speakers ==
Among the featured speakers were internationally recognized leaders from government and industry.

=== Business ===
- Alexander Yesayan, President of the Union of Advanced Technology Enterprises
- Yvonne Chiu, Chairman of the World Information Technology and Servies Alliance

=== Government ===
- Nikol Pashinyan, Prime Minister of Armenia

=== Academia/Media/Other ===
- Kim Kardashian, American media personality, businesswoman, socialite, model and actress
- Serj Tankian, Armenian-American musician, singer, songwriter, multi-instrumentalist, record producer, poet and political activist

== Gallery ==
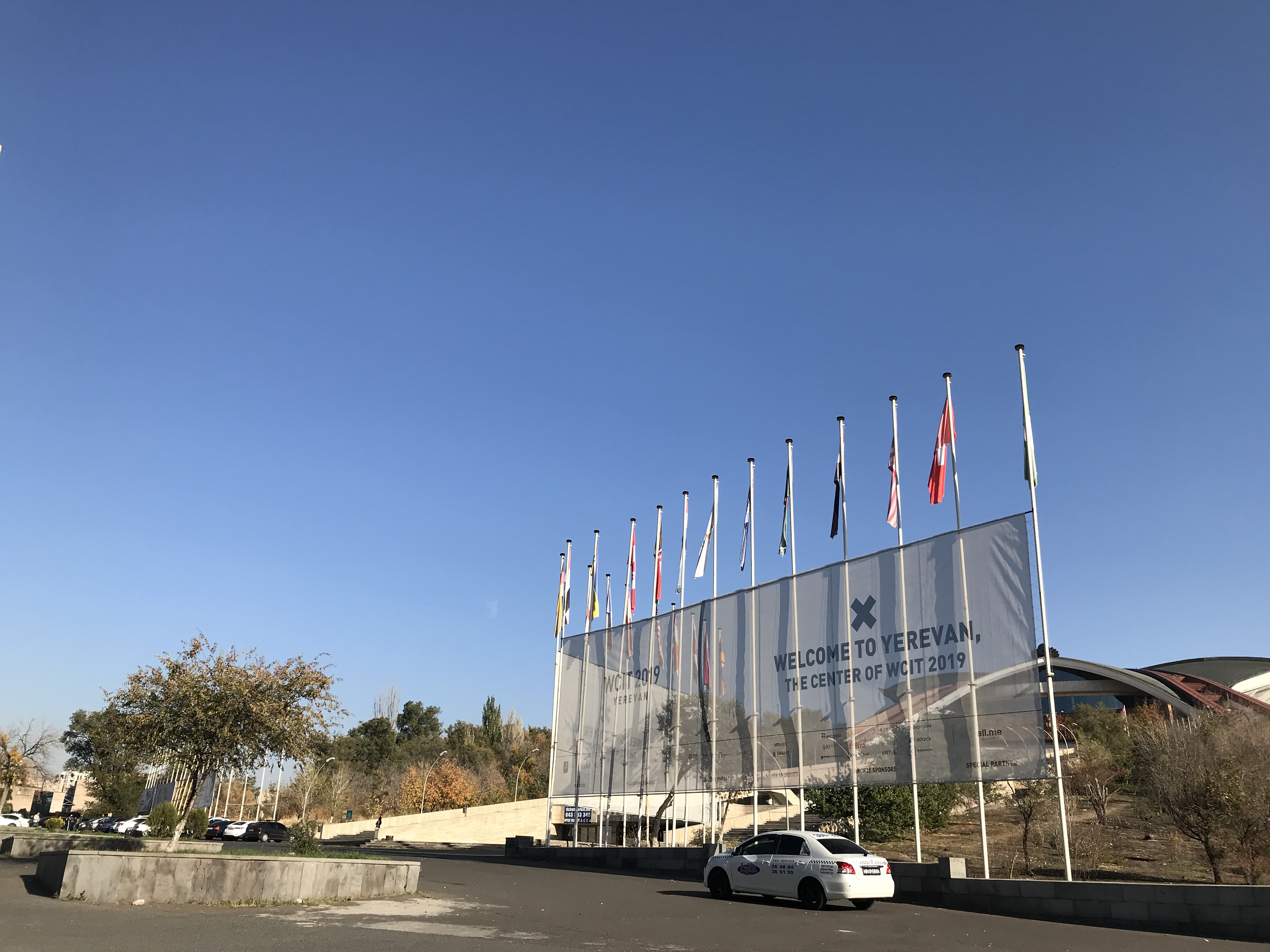
WCIT 2019 banner in Yerevan

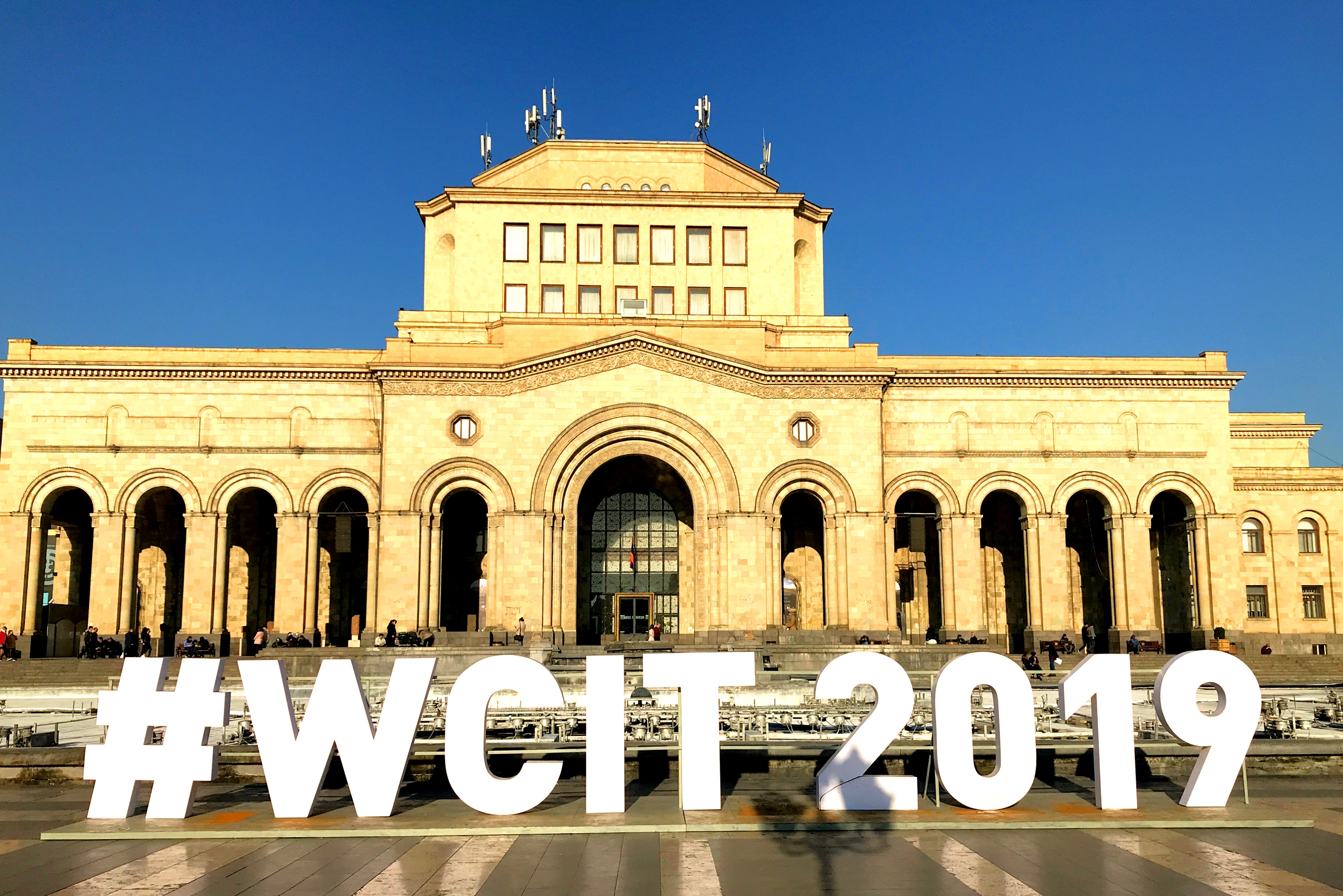
WCIT 2019 logo on Republic Square

== See also ==
- Information and communications technology
- World Information Technology and Services Alliance
