= Ludancun station =

Metro station in Shenzhen, Guangdong, China

Coordinates: 22°32′29.55″N 114°6′56.5″E

Ludancun 鹿丹村
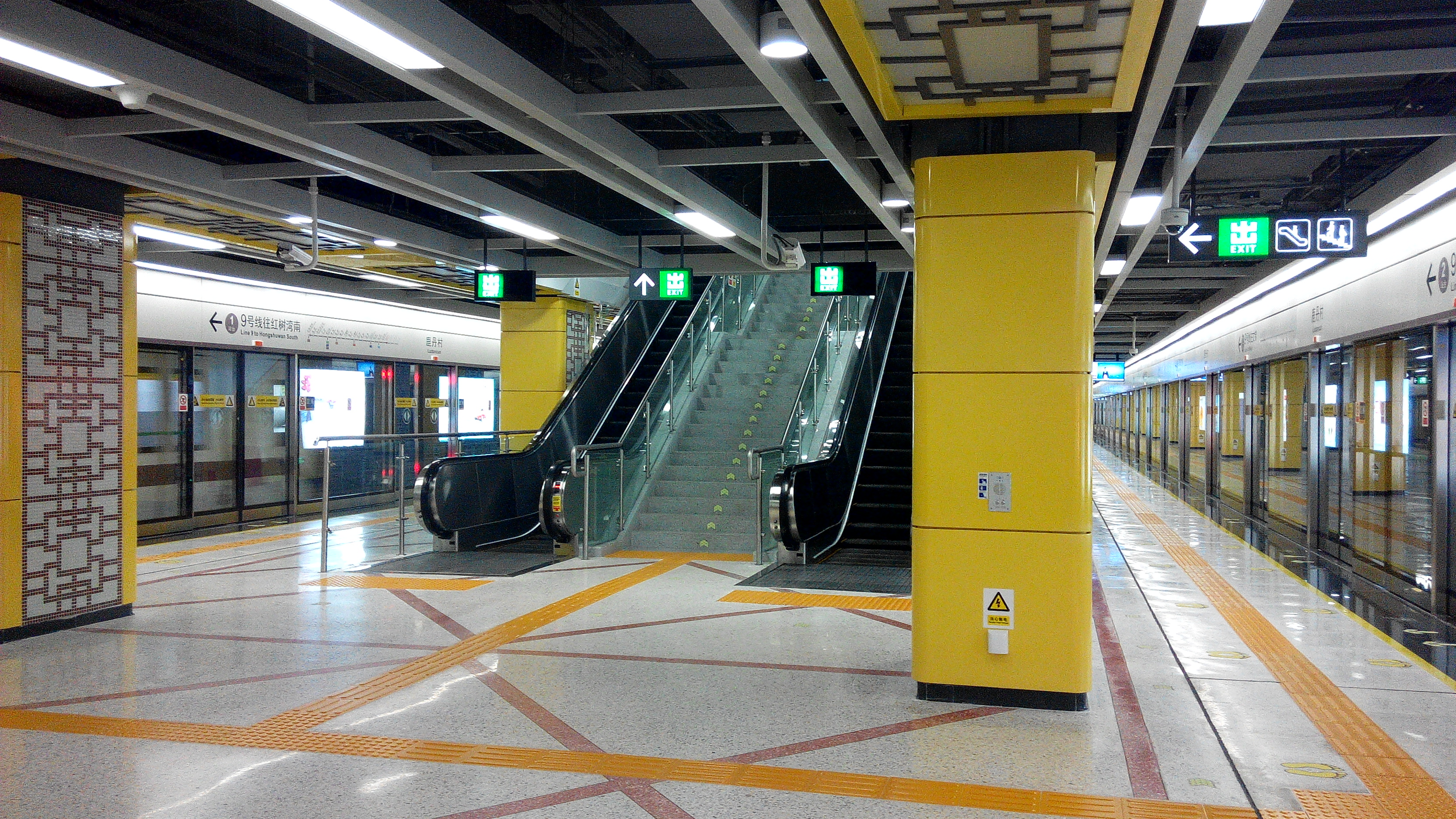

General information
- Location: Luohu District, Shenzhen, Guangdong; China
- Operated by: SZMC (Shenzhen Metro Group)
- Line: Line 9
- Platforms: 2

History
- Opened: 28 October 2016

Services
Preceding station	Shenzhen Metro	Following station
Renmin South towards Wenjin	Line 9	Hongling South towards Qianwan
Location

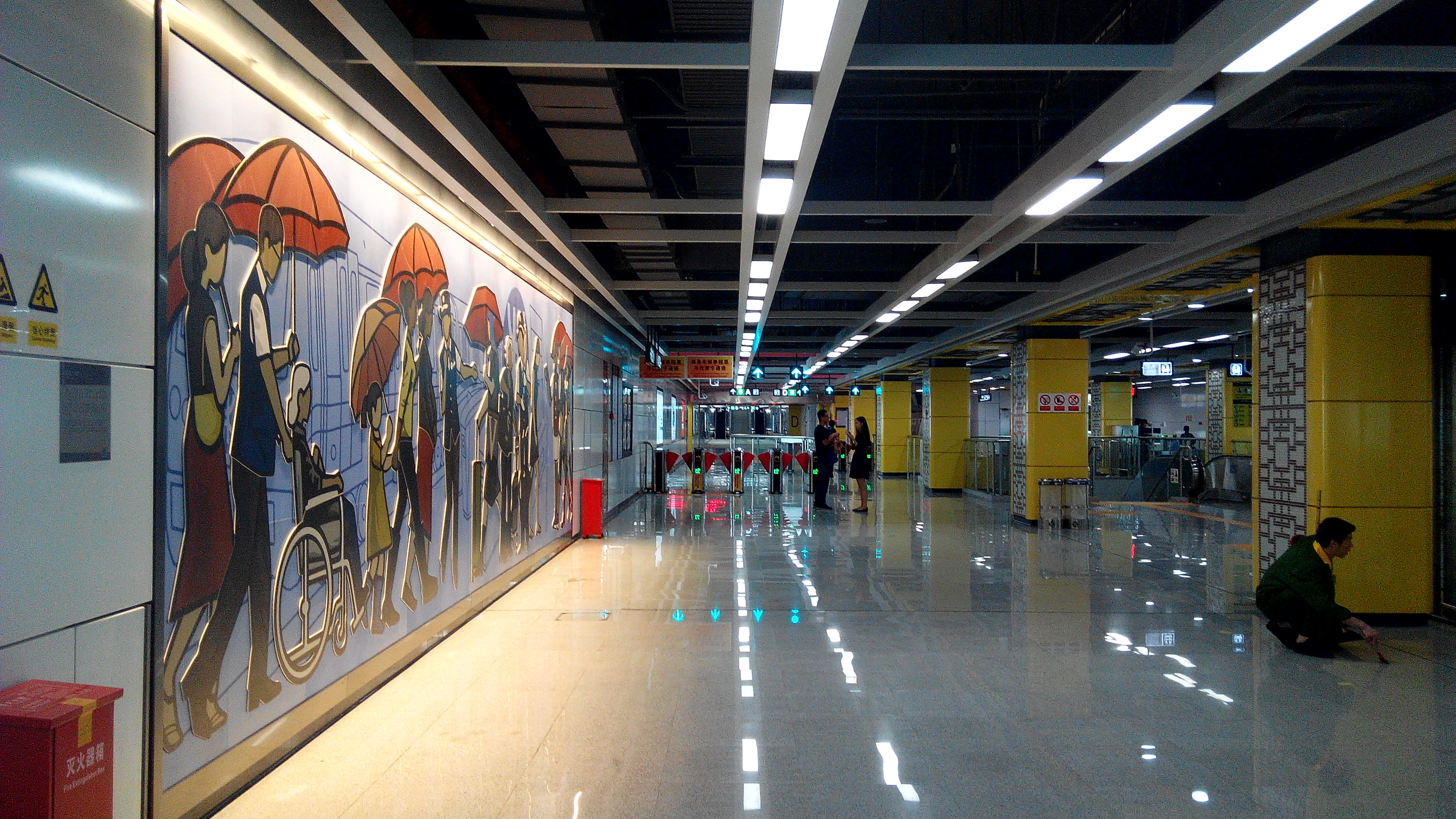
Concourse

Ludancun station (Chinese: 鹿丹村站; pinyin: Lùdān Cūn Zhàn; Jyutping: luk6 daan1 cyun1 zaam6) is a metro station of Shenzhen Metro Line 9. It opened on 28 October 2016. This station is located under the green belt on the west of the intersection of Binhe Boulevard and Bao'an South Road.

== Station layout ==
G	-	Exit
B1F; Concourse	Lobby	Customer Service, Shops, Vending machines, ATMs
B2F; Platforms	Platform 1	← Line 9 towards Qianwan (Hongling South)
B2F; Platforms	Island platform, doors will open on the left
B2F; Platforms	Platform 2	→ Line 9 towards Wenjin (Renmin South) →

== Exits ==
Exit		Destination
Exit A	A1	Sideroad of Binhe Boulevard (S), Binhe-Hongling Interchange, Ludan Building, Hongling Nanyuan
Exit A	A2	Ludancun
Exit B		Reserved
Exit C		Mumianhua Street (W), Huarui Building, Xingfuli, Cuihua Building, Lihua Building
Exit D		Jintang Street (W), Binhe Middle School, Binyuan Residence Community, Binhe Primary School
