= Luohu Commercial City =

Shopping mall in Shenzhen, China

Coordinates: 22°31′58″N 114°06′50″E

- Simplified Chinese: 罗湖商业城
- Traditional Chinese: 羅湖商業城
Transcriptions
Standard Mandarin
- Hanyu Pinyin: Luóhú Shāngyè Chéng
Yue: Cantonese
- Jyutping: lo4 wu4 soeng1 jip6 sing4

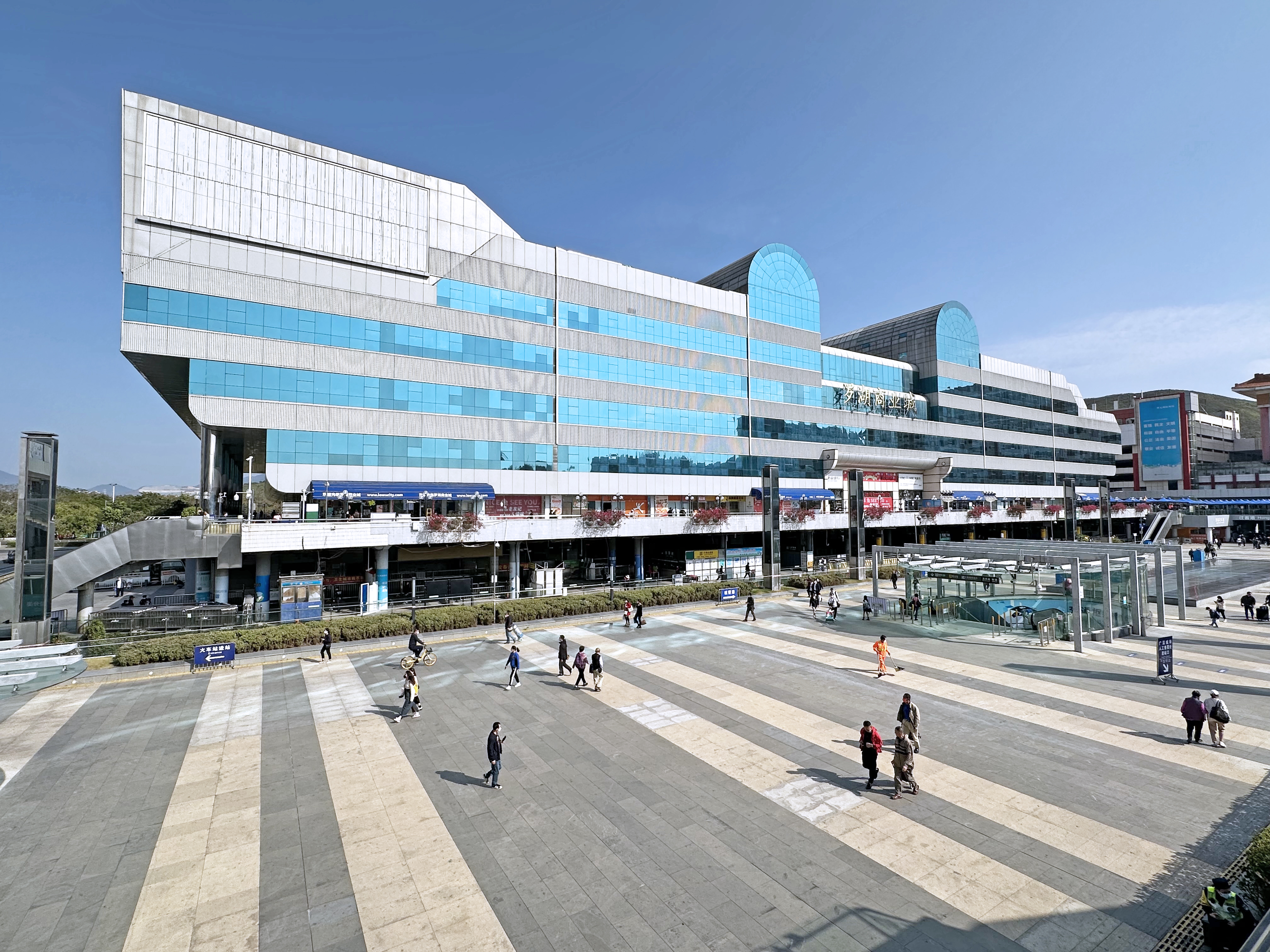
Exterior of Luohu Commercial City in 2023

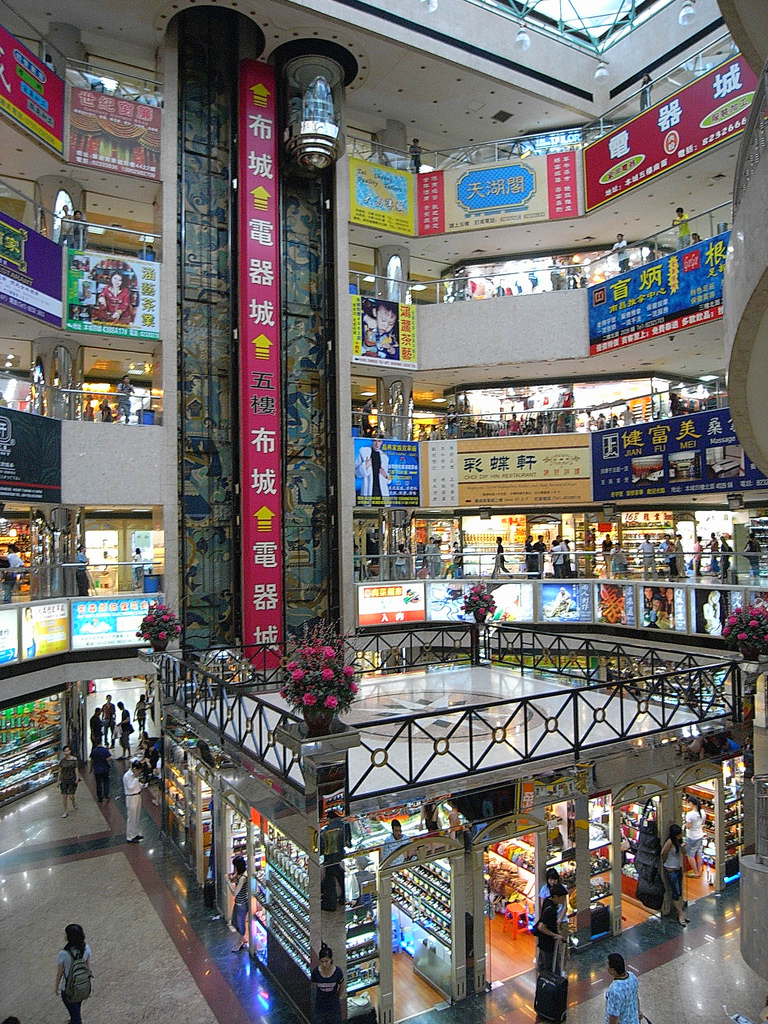
Interior of centre

Luohu Commercial City (Chinese: 罗湖商业城) is an enclosed shopping mall located on the Shenzhen side of the Shenzhen River, right outside the entrance/exit to Luohu Immigration Control Point. Also called "Luohu commercial market", it is popular with Hong Kong residents for cheap counterfeit "as good as original" clothes, merchandise and electronics.

== Shopping ==
The mall is five stories tall and sells a wide range of items, including watches, handbags, clothes, shoes, audio-visual products, souvenirs, curtains, DVDs, etc. The mall also includes a number of restaurants and shops that offer services, such as massages and dental work, at very low prices.

== Transportation ==
=== Inter-city ===
The Luohu Inter-city Bus Terminal is located directly under Luohu Commercial Center, and buses to locations in Guangdong and Fujian provinces are available here. A shuttle to Shenzhen Airport is also available in the Bus Terminal. Shenzhen railway station is next to the mall and provides long-distance travel across China. Visitors with permission to enter Hong Kong may cross the border at the Immigration Control Point and take the East Rail line from Lo Wu station as far as Admiralty.

=== Within Shenzhen ===
Located on the north side of Luohu Commercial Center is a bus station for intra-city buses and mini-buses. Immediately to the west is Luohu station on Line 1 of the Shenzhen Metro. Taxis are also available at a special taxi stand location below the intra-city bus station.
