= Common stored value ticket =

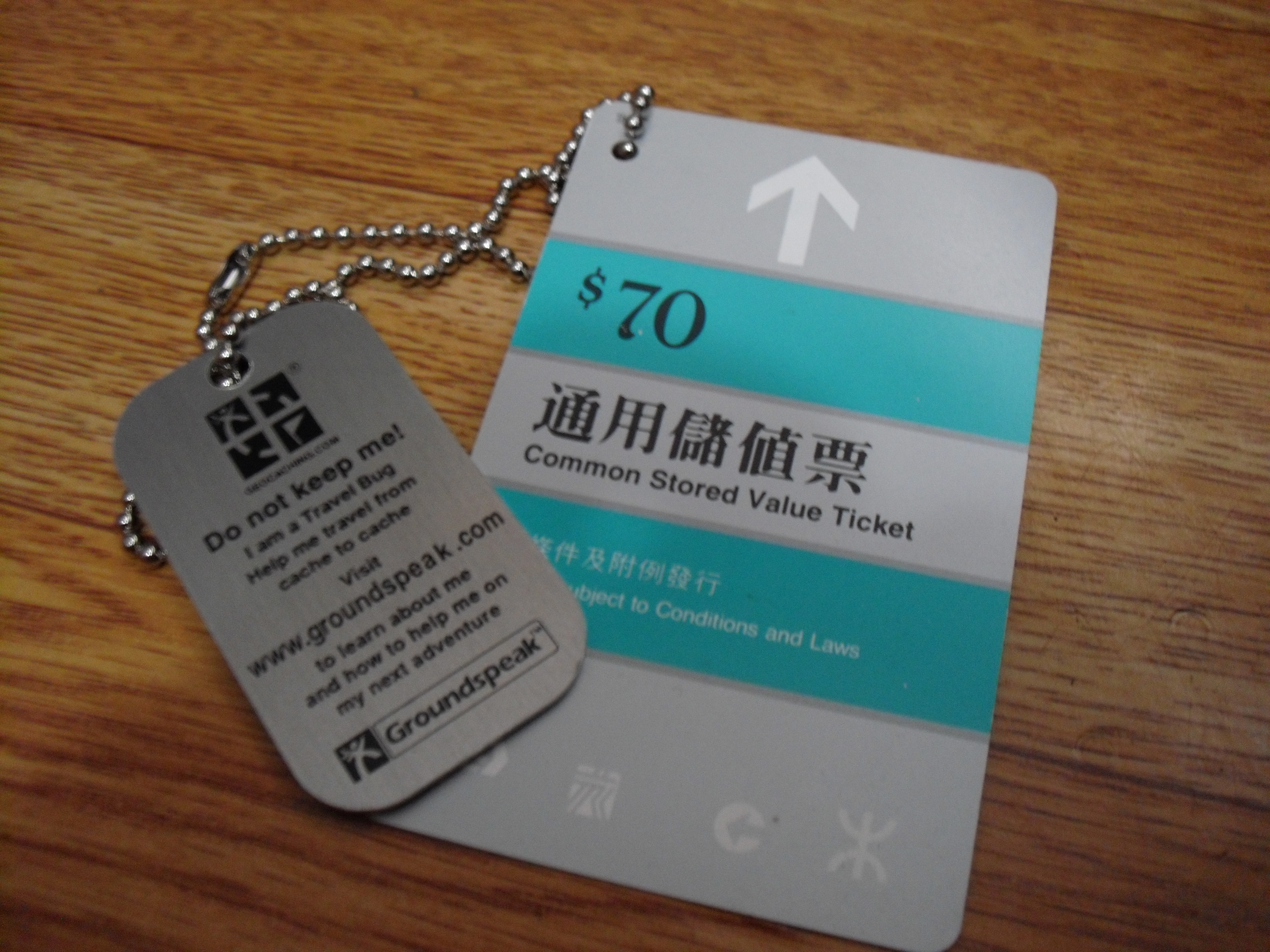
Common stored value ticket (right)

A common stored value ticket was a plastic magnetically sensitive card used for paying fares on the MTR and KCR railway systems in Hong Kong from 1984 to 1999. It was also used on Citybus and Kowloon Motor Bus for some MTR and KCR feeder bus services and two branches of Café de Coral, these tickets however, could not be used for 1st class services or trips from or to Lo Wu station on the KCR. The system was replaced by the Octopus card system in 1997 and phased out on 2 January 1999. The MTR and KCR have continued to issue magnetic strip cards for single-journey and souvenir tickets.

To encourage use, fares had a discount when the trip was paid by this card. In addition, higher value tickets had bonus value stored when purchased. (For example, a $200 ticket bought in early 1990s had a stored value of $212, while it still only cost $200 to purchase). To avoid the issue of making up fare for a trip with insufficient balance remaining on the ticket, it was stipulated that the last trip of the ticket was good for any distance on the railway, regardless of remaining balance on the ticket. Thus, it was possible to travel for the entire distance of the system with a common stored value ticket with ten Hong Kong cents (approximately US 1.5 cents) remaining on the ticket.

There were four stored value ticket levels that were produced, Children (for children aged 3-11) which had a value of $20, Students (for students aged 12-25 who held valid student passes) which had a value of $30, Seniors (for people above 65) which had a value of $20 and Adults which had values of $50, $103 (sold for $100) and $212 (sold for $200).

== History ==
In 1981, MTR Corporation started using magnetic strip cards as tickets. The turnstile would return the ticket to the user when the passenger enters and leaves the subway system, depending on how much money remains. If the entire value is used up, the ticket is recycled.

On 15 October 1984, KCR automated its ticketing system. The two companies jointly produced the common stored value ticket.

On 31 August 1998, MTR and KCR announced that the tickets were no longer to be sold.

On 2 January 1999, they were phased out entirely in favour of the Octopus card.
