= Octopussy (disambiguation) =

Octopussy is a 1983 James Bond film, or its title character.

Octopussy may also refer to:

- Octopussy and The Living Daylights or Octopussy, a 1966 James Bond story collection by Ian Fleming, or the title story
- Octopussy (soundtrack), a soundtrack album from the 1983 film
- Octopussy (adventure), a 1983 adventure for the role-playing game James Bond 007
- Octopussy (software), a log management computer software by Sebastien Thebert
- Octopussy, a Heesen Yacht
