= Proof-of-payment =

Public transportation fare collection system

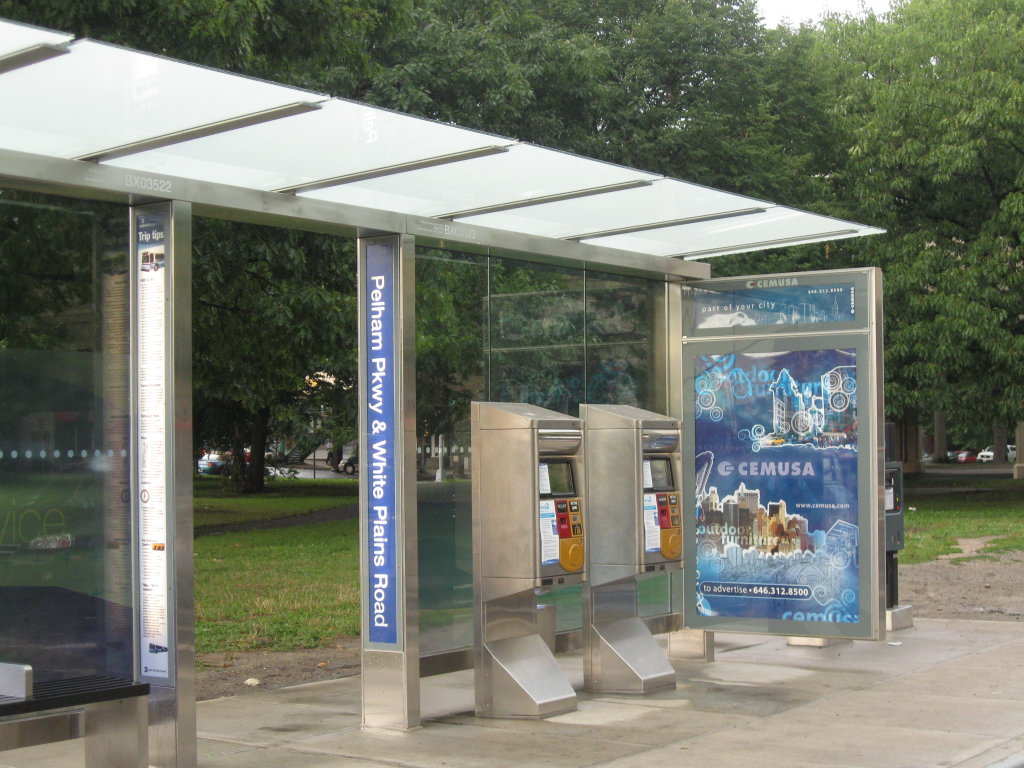
POP payment terminals in New York City, used for Select Bus Service lines.

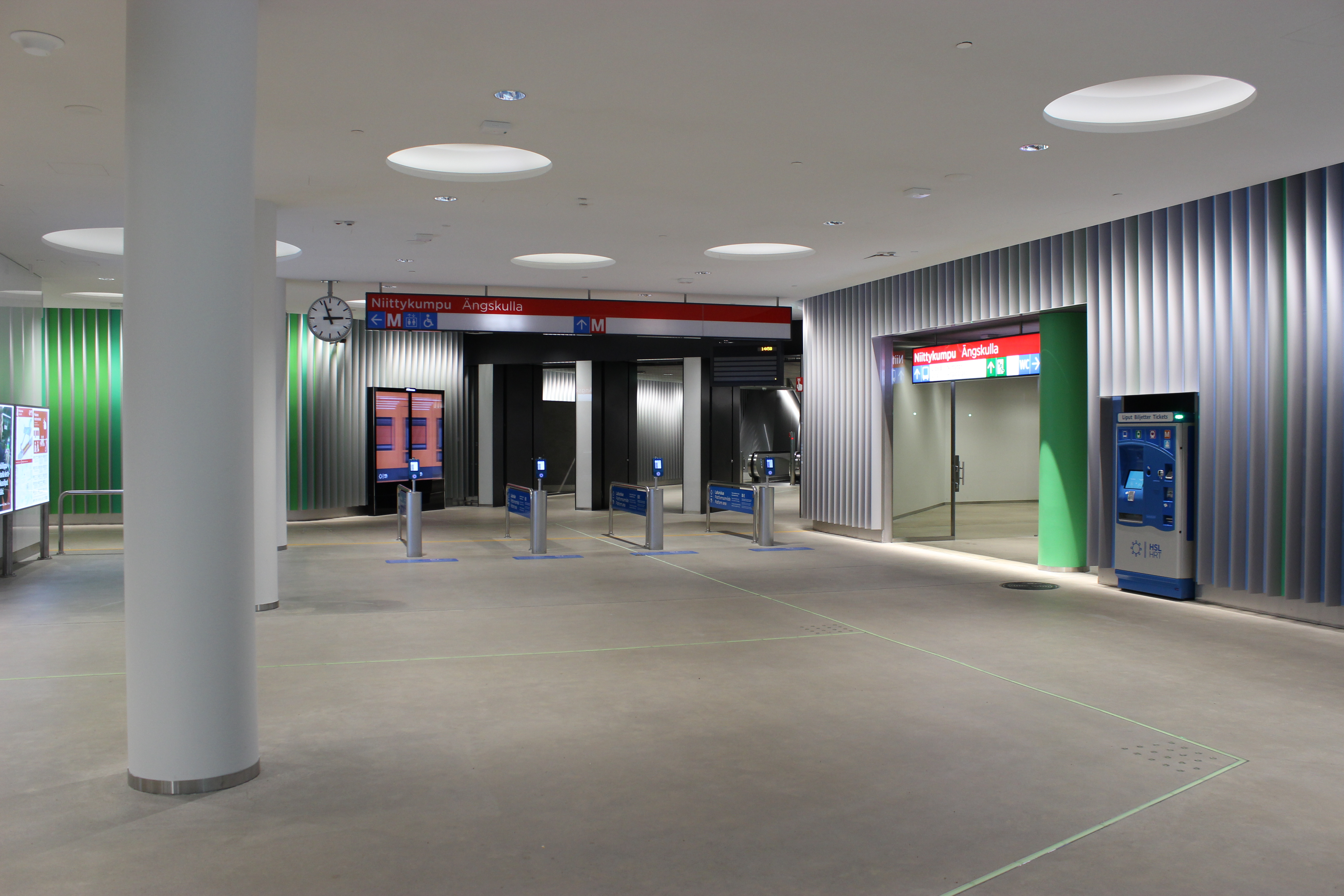
Ticket hall with open barrier line in Niittykumpu metro station, Espoo, Finland

Proof-of-payment (POP) or proof-of-fare (POF) is an honor-based fare collection system used on many public transportation systems. Instead of checking each passenger as they enter a fare control zone, passengers are required to carry a paper ticket, transit pass, transit smartcard — or open payment methods such as contactless credit or debit cards (if applicable) — after swiping or tapping on smart card readers, to prove that they have paid the valid fare. Fares are enforced via random spot-checks by inspectors such as conductors or enforcement officers, to ensure that passengers have paid their fares and are not committing fare evasion. On many systems, a passenger can purchase a single-use ticket or multi-use pass at any time in advance, but must insert the ticket or pass into a validation machine immediately before use. Validation machines in stations or on board vehicles time stamp the ticket. The ticket is then valid for some period of time after the stamped time.

This method is implemented when the transit authority believes it will lose less money to the resultant fare evasion than it would cost to install and maintain a more direct collection method. It may be used in systems whose passenger volume and density are not very high most of the time—as passenger volumes increase, more-direct collection methods become more profitable. However, in some countries it is common even on systems with very high passenger volume. Proof-of-payment is usually applied on one-person operated rail and road vehicles as well as on automatically operated rail lines.

The honor system can be complemented with a more direct collection approach where this would be feasible—a transit authority using POP will usually post fare inspectors, sometimes armed as a police force, to man entrances to stations on a discretionary basis when a high volume of passengers is expected. For example, transit users leaving a stadium after a major concert or sporting event will likely have to buy a ticket from an attendant (or show proof of payment) to gain access to the station serving the stadium. Direct fare collection methods may also be used at major hubs in systems that otherwise use POP. An example of this is the Tower City station on Cleveland's RTA Rapid Transit Red Line, which uses faregates.

Travel without a valid ticket is not usually a criminal offense, but a penalty fare or a fine can be charged.

== Advantages and disadvantages ==
The Caltrain commuter rail line along the San Francisco Peninsula posts a proof-of-payment logo on signs throughout stations, reminding riders to purchase tickets before boarding.

Advantages of proof-of-payment include lower labor costs for fare collection, simpler station design, easier access for mobility-impaired passengers, easier access for those carrying packages or in case of an emergency, and a more open feel for passengers. On buses, proof-of-payment saves drivers the time needed to collect fares, and makes it possible for all doors to be used for boarding. Validated tickets can double as transfers between lines. Collecting fares outside a bus "offers the greatest potential for reducing dwell time."

Disadvantages include higher rates of fare evasion, reduced security on station platforms when no barrier is used, increased potential of racial profiling and other unequal enforcement as "likely fare evaders" are targeted, and regularly exposing passengers to unpleasant confrontational situations when a rider without the proper proof is detained and removed from the vehicle. Visitors unfamiliar with a system's validation requirements who innocently misunderstand the rules are especially likely to get into trouble.

== Worldwide uses ==
Proof-of-payment is popular in Germany, where it was widely introduced during the labor shortages resulting from the Economic Miracle of the 1960s. It has also been adopted in Eastern Europe and Canada and has made some inroads in newer systems in the United States. The first use of the term "POP" or "Proof of Payment" on a rail line in North America is believed to have been in Edmonton in 1980. Since then, many new light rail, streetcar, and bus rapid transit systems have adopted the procedure, mainly to speed up boarding by avoiding the hassles of crowding at doors to pay fares at a farebox beside the driver as is common practice on traditional buses. TriMet in Portland, Oregon was the first large transit agency to adopt proof of payment on its bus system, from September 1982 to April 1984. It was discontinued after finding that fare evasion and vandalism increased and little productivity was added through drivers waiting for fares to be paid. San Francisco's MUNI system became the first North American system-wide adopter of the proof-of-payment system on July 1, 2012 across its buses, light rail and heritage streetcars, with the exception of cable cars, allowing boarding on all the available doors.
