= Octopus Cards Limited =

Operator of Hong Kong smart card

- Type: Subsidiary
- Industry: Payment systems
- Predecessor: None
- Founded: Hong Kong (1994)
- Headquarters: Hong Kong, Hong Kong
- Area served: Hong Kong, Shenzhen and other major Chinese cities
- Key people: Sunny Cheung Yiu-tong (CEO)
- Products: Octopus card
- Services: Smart card payment systems
- Owner: Major transport operators in Hong Kong
- Number of employees: 200
- Parent: Octopus Holdings Limited
- Website: www.octopus.com.hk

Octopus Cards Limited (Chinese: 八達通卡有限公司) is the operator of the Octopus rechargeable contactless smart card used in an electronic payment system in Hong Kong.

Octopus Cards Limited is a wholly owned subsidiary of Octopus Holdings Limited. Established in 1994 under the name of "Creative Star" by the major transportation companies in Hong Kong, Octopus Cards Limited is the operator of the Octopus System and the issuer of Octopus.

The Octopus card was introduced in 1997 with the aim of providing a simple way to pay fares on public transport in Hong Kong. Octopus then extended its reach into simple micropayments for purchases in retail outlets and a simple way for cardholders to gain access to buildings and schools and to identify themselves. In January 2002, it was renamed Octopus Cards Limited from Creative Star. Prompted by the business expansion of the Octopus card, Octopus Holdings Limited was formed in 2005 after a company restructure and Octopus Cards Limited became a wholly owned subsidiary of the new company. Today, over 440 service providers accept Octopus, and new uses are regularly being added.

Octopus' popularity in Hong Kong declined in the mid-2010s due to the rise of mobile payment methods.

== Controversy over use of personal data ==
In mid-2010, some individuals complained that they had received unsolicited sales calls which they alleged came from business partners of Octopus. Octopus chief executive Prudence Chan initially denied that any personal data had been given over to third parties, but said that cardholders' consent to use their data would have been given when they registered for the Octopus reward program, which had an opt-out mechanism. The company came under fire for deception when a former worker at The Cigna Group said that Octopus had bought data on 2.4 million reward scheme cardholders. At a hearing before the Privacy Commission on 26 July 2010, it was subsequently revealed that Octopus had entered into partnership agreements through which card-holders' personal details were sold to Cigna and others for HK$44 million. The company disclosed that personal data collected from Octopus rewards program had been sold to six vendors since 2002, and that two such relationships were still current. The company was further criticised when it was revealed that there were no safeguards on the transfer or reuse of the personal data to parties outside of Hong Kong. Chan apologised before a Legislative Council's finance affairs panel meeting; she said that she "might have used a wrong definition of selling [personal data] at the time." Legislators from all parties demanded Chan's resignation for attempting to mislead the public.
