= World Innovation, Technology and Services Alliance =

- Predecessor: World Computing Services Industry Association
- Formation: 1978
- Type: International Trade Association
- Headquarters: Vienna, Virginia, United States
- Chairman: Dato' Dr Sean Seah
- Deputy Chairman: Robert Janssen
- Website: http://www.witsa.org

The World Innovation, Technology and Services Alliance (WITSA) is a consortium of tech associations from 80 countries and economies. WITSA was founded in 1978 as the World Computing Services Industry Association, and participates in advocacy in international public policy that affects the "global information infrastructure". It voices the concerns of the international IT industry in organizations such as the World Trade Organization, the Organisation for Economic Co-operation and Development, and the G7.

WITSA represents IT industry associations in over 80 countries or economies. WITSA's motto is "Fulfilling the Promise of the Digital Age".

WITSA World Innovation, Technology and Services Alliance elected the 2022-2024 Chairman and Board of Directors on September 12, 2022 with Dato' Dr Sean Seah, then Chairman of the National Tech Association of Malaysia (PIKOM) was elected as the new chairman.

== World Congress on Innovation and Technology (WCIT) ==
- 2023, Sarawak, Malaysia
- 2022, Penang, Malaysia
- 2021, Dhaka, Bangladesh
- 2020, Penang, Malaysia
- 2019, Yerevan, Armenia
- 2018, Hyderabad, India
- 2017, Taipei, Taiwan
- 2016, Brasilia, Brazil
- 2014, Guadalajara, Mexico
- 2012, Montreal, Canada
- 2010, Amsterdam, the Netherlands
- 2008, Kuala Lumpur, Malaysia
- 2006, Austin, Texas, USA
- 2004, Athens, Greece
- 2002, Adelaide, Australia
- 2000, Taipei, Taiwan
- 1998, Fairfax, Virginia, USA
- 1996, Bilbao, Spain
- 1994, Yokohama, Japan
- 1992, London, England
- 1990, Washington D.C., USA
- 1988, Paris, France
- 1986, Toronto, Canada
- 1984, Tokyo, Japan
- 1982, Copenhagen, Denmark
- 1980, San Francisco, California, USA
- 1978, Barcelona, Spain

For additional information regarding the WCIT, see the "WCIT - A Proud History" document [PDF]

== Other programs and events ==
=== WITSA Global Innovation and Tech Excellence Awards ===
The WITSA Global Innovation and Tech Excellence Awards honor achievements in the application of information technology around the globe. Winners have exhibited excellence in one of the following categories: Digital Opportunity/Inclusion Award, Smart Cities Award, Sustainable Growth/Circular Economy Award, Innovative eHealth Solutions Award, Public/Private Partnership Award, E-Education & Learning Award, Emerging Digital Solutions Award, and Startup Ecosystem Award. A Chairman's Award is presented to a nominee selected from the entire pool of candidates from all awards categories. The award ceremonies are a signature event of the proceedings at the World Congress on Innovation and Technology.

== See also ==
- Information and communications technology
- WCIT 2019
- Health information technology
- Information technology
