= Phantom withdrawal =

A phantom withdrawal is a cash withdrawal from an automatic teller machine wherein money has been withdrawn from an account, and neither the customer nor bank admit liability.

If the banks are unable to find any error on their side, they conclude that the withdrawals were done by the customers. Many experts ascribe phantom withdrawals to criminal activity using the banking network itself.

== See also ==
- Automated Teller Machine (ATM)
- ATM Industry Association
- Security of ATMs
