= Talking ATM =

Type of automated teller machine

A Talking ATM is a type of automated teller machine (ATM) that provides audible instructions so that persons who cannot read an ATM screen can independently use the machine. All audible information is delivered privately through a standard headphone jack on the face of the machine or a separately attached telephone handset. Information is delivered to the customer either through pre-recorded sound files or via text-to-speech speech synthesis.

== History ==
The world's first talking ATM for the blind was an NCR machine unveiled by the Royal Bank of Canada on October 22, 1997, at a bank branch on the corner of Bank Street and Queen Street in Ottawa, Ontario. The talking ATM was a result of concerns Chris and Marie Stark, two blind customers, raised with the bank beginning in 1984. Their concerns turned into a discrimination complaint with the Canadian Human Rights Commission in 1991. The machine was manufactured by NCR and adapted by Ottawa-based T-Base Communications at a cost of about $500,000 Canadian dollars.

== Usage ==
A user plugs a standard headset into the jack, and can hear instructions such as "press 1 for withdrawal", "press 2 for deposit." There is an audible orientation for first time users, and audible information describing the location of features such as the number keypad, deposit slot, and card slot.

With the increasing processing power available inside ATMs today, most ATM manufacturers provide the ability to connect headsets to their ATMs. Speech features are now available from lower-cost ATM producers, which means that the technology should gradually appear in off-premises ATM installations as equipment wears out and is replaced.

== By country ==
=== Talking ATMs in Australia ===
Several banks across Australia including National Australia Bank, Westpac and Commonwealth Bank have deployed numerous Talking ATMs throughout the country in an initiative to support accessibility.

=== Talking ATMs in Canada ===
By 2002 Royal Bank had 15 talking ATMs in operation and announced that an additional 250 units would be installed.

Relevant legislation and standards

- Canadian Human Rights Act
- Canadian Standards Association: CAN/CSA-B651.2-07 (R2012) – Accessible Design for Self-Service Interactive Devices.

=== Talking ATMs in the Philippines ===
Metrobank uses talking ATMs. BDO have also deployed talking ATMs since 2025.

=== Talking ATMs in Turkey ===
Yapı ve Kredi Bankası implemented the first Talking ATMs in Turkey in December 2010. The Talking ATM function is specifically designed for visually impaired or partially sighted customers of Yapi Kredi or other banks. Utilising the text-to-speech technology, customers can perform cash withdrawal or balance inquiry transactions via Talking ATMs. The audible transaction starts when a headphone plug is connected to the Talking ATM's headphone jack, and is terminated for security when the jack is disconnected. Optionally, the customer may select to mask the account information on the ATM screen.

=== Talking ATMs in the UK ===
Barclays initially launched, with over 80% of their 4,100 ATMs offering the functionality. This included the 800 ATMs at ASDA superstores which are operated by Barclays. In addition, Northern Bank in the UK have deployed 85 talking cash machines out of their estate of over 200 which amounts to 40 per cent of their estate. Most recent machines installed by banks include a standard audio jack for blind persons to interact with the machine, but these facilities have not yet been enabled.

In 2011 the UK's leading charity for blind and partially sighted people, RNIB, launched a campaign to get major banks to install talking cash machines. They had also been working with LOCOG from 2009 to ensure that talking cashpoints would be provided in the Olympic Park for the London 2012 Olympics and Paralympics. However, a few weeks before the Games, sponsor and sole provider Visa announced that they would only be able to install the necessary software in time on two machines.

Following consultation and collaboration with the RNIB, during 2013, Nationwide Building Society, the world’s largest mutual organisation, started introducing voice guided transactions across their network of 1,300 ATMs.

In April 2013 RBS publicly announced as part of their 2012 Sustainability report that they would be installing Talking ATMs from 2014 onwards, as part of a wider ATM upgrade.

=== Talking ATMs in the US ===
The first public actions in the United States to achieve ATM access for the blind occurred in June 1999. On June 3, Mellon Bank and PNC Bank were sued in federal courts in Philadelphia and Pittsburgh respectively. On June 25, 1999, Wells Fargo became the first major bank in the United States to commit to installing talking ATMs. In a legal settlement with blind community leaders, the bank agreed to install a talking ATM at all of its 1,500 ATM locations in California. The company has subsequently installed talking ATMs at all ATM locations in all states. In July 1999, Citibank agreed to pilot five talking ATMs in and around San Francisco and Los Angeles. The Citibank machine represented a unique engineering and research challenge as it uses a touch screen interface and has no function keys to offer access to the blind. All Citibank locations with this kind of machine have been adapted with talking functionality.

The first talking ATM in the United States was a Diebold machine installed on October 1, 1999, in San Francisco's City Hall by the San Francisco Federal Credit Union. Like the Royal Bank machine, it was adapted by T-Base Communications. In March 2000, Bank of America became the first financial institution to commit to installing a talking ATM at all of its ATM locations nationwide. A legal settlement called for the installation of hundreds of machines with later negotiations for a schedule for the remainder.

By 2012, there were in excess of 100,000 talking ATM's in the USA.

Relevant legislation and standards

- Americans with Disabilities Act of 1990

=== Talking ATMs in India ===
In 2012, one of the leading Public Sector Bank Union Bank of India unveiled India's first ever Truly Accessible and Talking ATM in Vastrapur, Ahmedabad, Gujarat on 6 June 2012 for visually and physically disabled people. Union Bank of India has done pioneer work on Talking ATM in India. Union Bank's Talking ATM model and workflow has set a benchmark. The bank has also developed Talking ATM usage accessible manuals in DAISY and electronic Braille formats. List of talking ATMs locations and accessible instructions manuals can be easily downloaded from bank's website.

On October 4, 2012 State Bank of India, India's largest Public Sector Bank, launched its first and Real Talking ATM in New Delhi. State Bank of India has done large scale deployment of Talking ATM across India. State Bank inaugurated its 5555th Talking ATM on 1 July 2014.

Few more banks namely Bank of Baroda, Corporation Bank, Citibank, HSBC and more public sector banks, private banks, cooperative banks in India have either deployed or taken good initiatives on Talking ATMs for the blind.

A repository of Talking ATM addresses of banks in India is made available by 'Talking ATM India Locator' website which is a voluntary and non-commercial service.

== See also ==
- ATM Industry Association (ATMIA)
- Automated cash handling
- Braille
- Security of Automated Teller Machines
- Self service
- Verification and validation
