= Armed Forces Financial Network =

Interbank network

Armed Forces Financial Network (AFFN)
- Operating area: United States and international
- ATMs: ±800,000
- Founded: 1985
- Owner: Defense Credit Union Council and Association of Military Banks of America
- Website: www.affn.org

The Armed Forces Financial Network (AFFN) is an interbank network. It provides electronic financial transactions services to the military banking and defense credit union sector. It connects approximately 346 banks and credit unions with over 800,000 ATMs and 2.3 million point-of-sale locations that are often in or near military bases both in the United States and overseas. John M. Broda is the president and chief executive officer of the network.

== History ==
The Armed Forces Financial Network was founded in 1985 at the request of the United States Army to support the "Surepay" direct deposit initiative. The AFFN's role in the Surepay initiative was to be one way U.S. military personnel could gain access to their money.

In 2017 the Armed Forces Financial Network launched a chip and pin travel card.
