= Teller system =

A teller system is the integrated hardware and software used for retail or wholesale banking transactions, most systems communicate with a core banking system or mainframe over a secured network. The hardware may include a computer or terminal, Cash Drawers, Receipt and Passbook Validator/Printers, magnetic strip readers, pin keypads, bill counters, and bill/coin dispensers. The software is usually based on client/server where several clients (teller stations) are networked to a server which communicates to the mainframe via a dedicated line or satellite.

== See also ==
- Automated teller machine
