= Test money =

Dummy coins or banknotes, used to test equipment

Test money (or test notes, test bills, funny money, Monopoly money) is part of the apparatus often used when testing currency handling equipment such as automatic teller machines.

Although testing with real banknotes or coins is often desirable, their financial value means security procedures must be set up for the tests. Furthermore, if testing includes purposefully damaging or destroying currency to see how the machinery will react, the resulting loss of value will be an issue. To remove these concerns, test money is often used in place of real currency.

Test money may share some or all of the characteristics of a given currency (size, paper type, paper thickness, colouring, printing characteristics, various denominations), but it also has some form of easily identifiable, non-removable, non-mutable characteristics that differentiate it from legal tender, scrip, or counterfeit currency.

For certain types of bulk cash handling equipment, the test money units may represent bundled or rolled currency.

Some members of the notaphiliatelic community collect test money.

== Use in television and movies ==
Test money is often used in television and movie production, for similar reasons.
