= Vortex Engineering =

- Founded: 2001
- Headquarters: No 6B, 6th Floor, IIT Madras Research Park, Chennai, India
- Area served: Financial Institutions and banks
- Key people: L. Kannan, Founder Sathyan Gopalan, CEO Gopalakrishnan Srinivasan, Financial Controller
- Products: ATMs, Cash Dispenser, Multivendor ATM Monitoring and Management Software
- Services: ATM Managed Services
- Number of employees: 201-500
- Website: https://vortexindia.co.in

Vortex Engineering is a pioneer in low-power ATMs and is an India-based technology company incubated by IIT-Madras. Vortex manufactures self-service transaction systems (such as ATMs) for banks, independent ATM operators, and other financial institutions. Vortex also owns a Multi-vendor ATM Monitoring and Management Software, developed in-house. It can monitor and manage any brand of ATM.

== Global market ==
Vortex ATMs have a global reach of up to 22 countries in Asia & Africa combined. As of March 2023, DR Congo, Djibouti, Ethiopia, Egypt, Ghana, Mauritania, Nigeria, Rwanda, South Africa, Tanzania, Uganda, and Zambia from Africa and Afghanistan, Bangladesh, Cambodia, India, Indonesia, Myanmar, Nepal, Philippines, Sri Lanka, and Vietnam from Asia are in its scope of business.

== History ==
Incorporated on 12 March 2001, Vortex Engineering is a provider of Automated Teller Machines (ATMs) and multi-vendor ATM management software products. Founded by Mr Kannan Laxminarayan, an alumnus of the IIT-Madras. Later the company was incubated by IIT-Madras.

In March 2009, Vortex Engineering secured a seed capital infusion of Rs. 50 lakhs from the Aavishkaar Group. This injection of funds catalyzed the company's expansion and enabled it to further refine its products and services.

Major investors includes entities such as Aavishkaar, Tata Capital, Bamboo Capital, and IFC. Their first pilot deployment was for disbursal of NREGA wages through their ATMs in Tamil Nadu, in association with IIT Madras in 2008.

They made their first major breakthrough with the winning of an order for 545 ATMs including 300 solar powered ATMs from the State Bank of India. Vortex ATMs are currently used in almost all states of India. The total ATMs deployed across the globe had reached over 8000.

In June 2024, Vortex Engineering stakes had acquired by Vakrangee Limited.
