= ATM burglaries using explosives =

Type of robbery

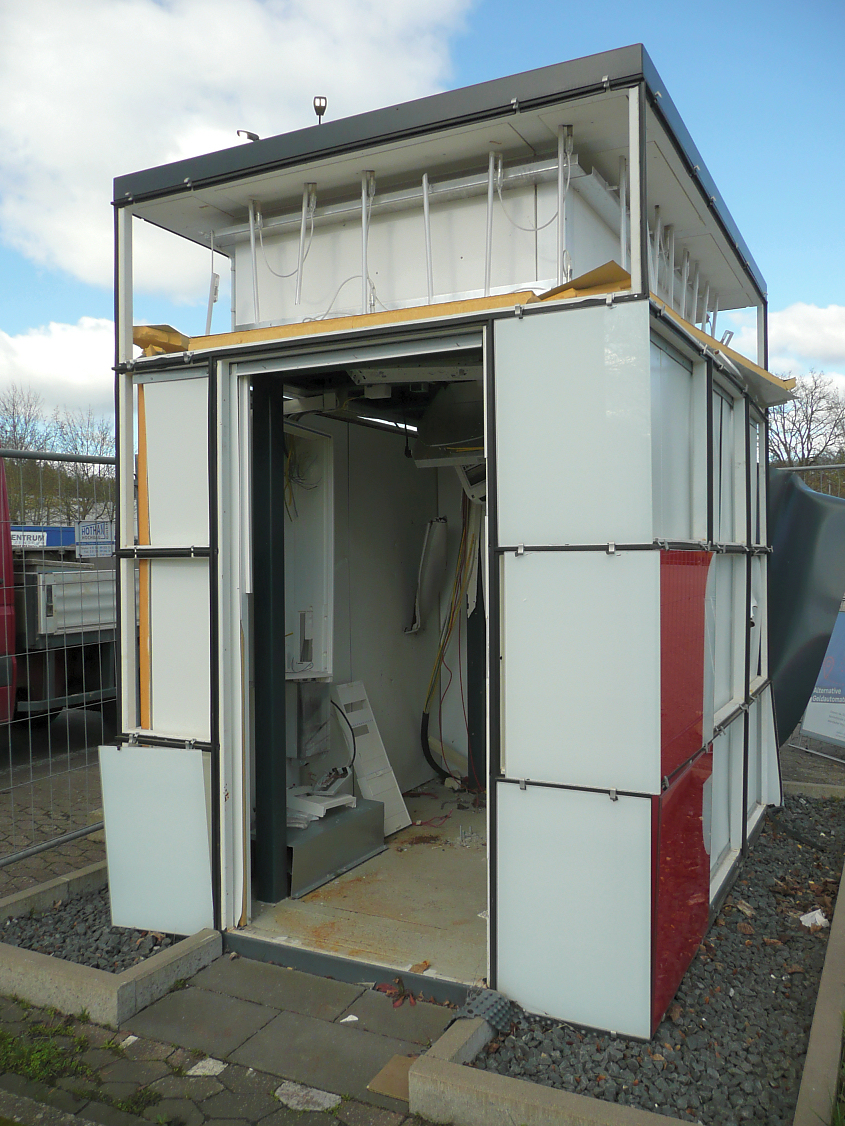
Blown up ATM on a parking lot in Hameln

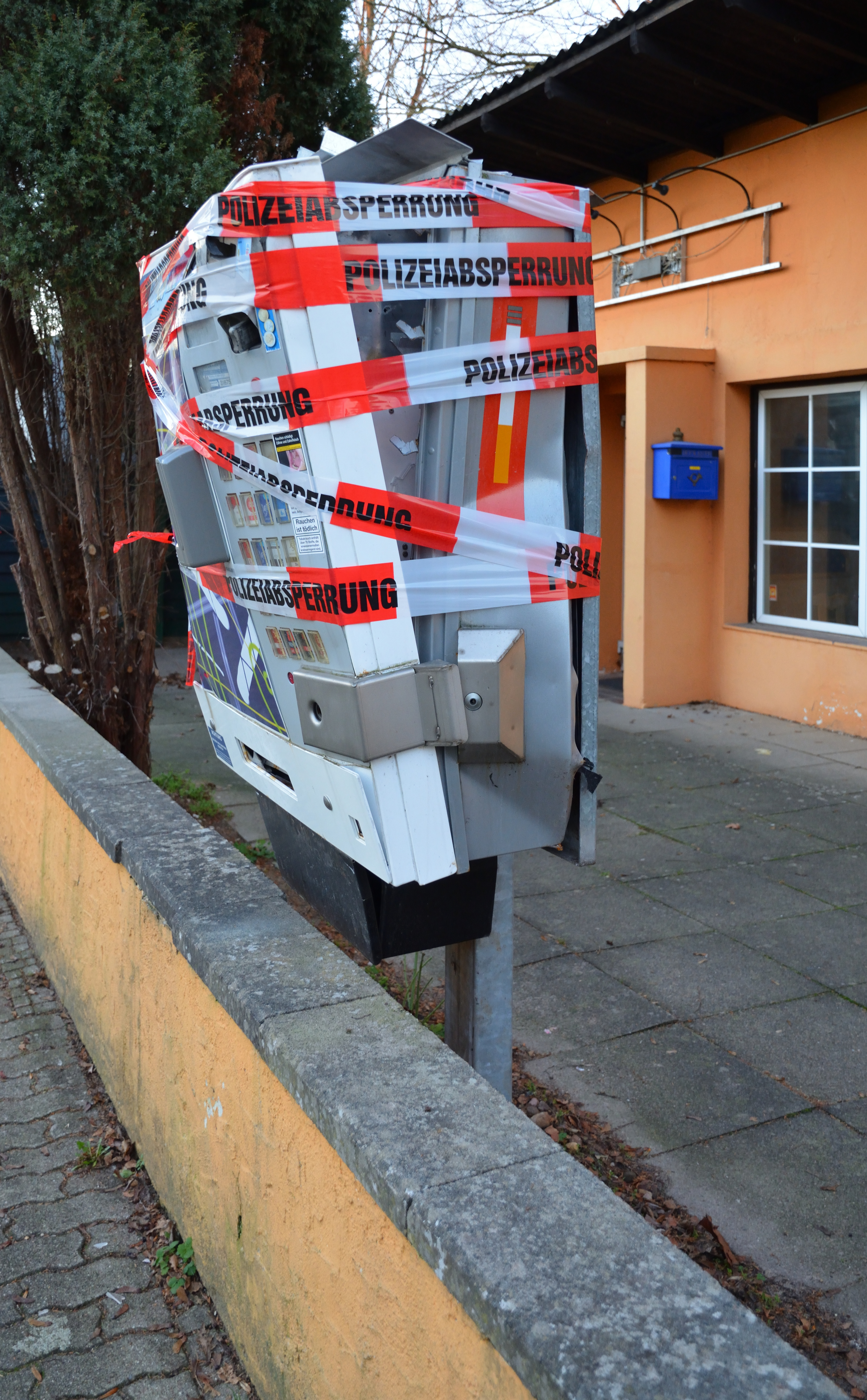
Blown up cigarette vending machine in Itzehoe

The idea of an ATM blow up is to destroy the automated teller machine, in order to get the money that is inside it. It is also called ATM burglary using explosives. Such burglaries have also been done with other vending machines, such as those selling tickets, cigarettes or other goods. In some cases, the machines are destroyed to get the goods that are inside the machine.

Blowing up a machine is a crime.

== Mode of operation ==
Very often, a flammable substance is led to the machine. Common substances are air with propane gas or acetylene. A device is then used to detonate the mixture remotely. These devices are often self-built, improvised explosive devices. In other cases, true explosives or pyrotechnics are used.

Such attacks began in the Netherlands. As the country reduced the number of ATMs from 20000 to 5000 by 2015 and discouraged cash use because of the crimes, the mostly Moroccan-Dutch gangs expert in the attacks moved elsewhere such as Germany, where cash is especially popular. Both professional criminals, and amateurs blow up devices. They operate alone, or in small groups or gangs. Usually, they operate at night, when there are few customers. Most detonations occur in the early morning hours.

Despite German banks spending more than €300 million on additional security, the Federal Criminal Police Office estimated that as of 2024 60% of attacks on ATMs in the country succeeded. When they blow up the machine, the perpetrators are not always successful, and often they don't get to the money inside the machine. The Federal Criminal Police Office reported that in 2017, that only in 48% of the cases, the perpetrators were able to get some money. In most cases, the damage done is more than the money stolen. In some cases, the damage is more than a million euros. There can also be a lot of damage to the surrounding area. The explosions cause damage to buildings, in some cases, uninvolved people are hurt.

When a group of people blew up a ticket vending machine in Wittighausen, Baden-Württemberg, on 17 September 2013, one of the perpetrators was killed. On December 10, 2016, there was a lot of damage to the bank, and the doctor's office opposite the bank, in Hagen. Another detonation of a ticket vending machine, in Dortmund, on March 21, 2017, killed the peretrator. In Ottersberg, Lower Saxony, an apartment block had to be evacuated after a detonation of an ATM in April 2017, for fear that the building would collapse. A detonation in Espelkamp, on March 15, 2018, set the whole branch office of the bank on fire. On March 31, 2018, a mixed-use apartment block was heavily damaged, when there was an attempt at blowing up an ATM. Because of such attacks landlords reluctant to lease space to banks with ATMs, especially when there are residences in the same building.

In 2020, about 40% of the detonations were done using explosives.

== Countermeasures ==
Color trail after an activated cartouche, at an ATM blow up, in Dresden

There are countermeasures: These include cartouches with specially colored ink, which will mark the bank notes, if an attempted blow up is detected. While ink is the most common ATM attack-prevention system worldwide, a disadvantage is that it newer glue systems make the cash unusable. There are also systems to monitor, and neutralize gas that is pumped into the ATM, and finally, the chamber containing the money has a strong protection, which will survive a detonation. Other measures include closing ATMs that are accessible from outside. Because more potent explosives are used more often, there are setups that use up to 15 cm of reinforced concrete on free-standing ATMs. These constructions weight up to 10 tonnes, and conventional explosives show no effect on them. Criminals have adjusted their methods in response. When anti-gas explosion prevention devices and reinforced ATMs were installed, thieves began using leaf blowers to remove smoke, and more powerful solid explosives.
