= Mohamed M. Atalla =

Egyptian engineer (1924–2009)

Mohamed Martin Atalla
- محمد عطاالله
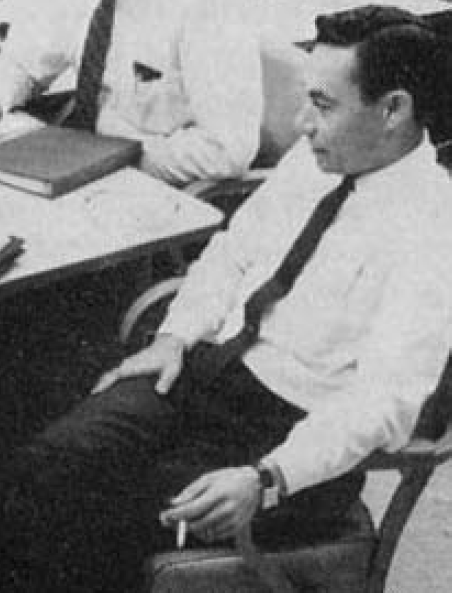
- Mohamed Atalla as Director of Semiconductor Research at HP Associates in 1963
- Born: August 4, 1924; Port Said, Kingdom of Egypt
- Died: December 30, 2009 (aged 85); Atherton, California, USA
- Other names: M. M. Atalla; "Martin" M. Atalla; "John" M. Atalla
- Education: Cairo University (BSc); Purdue University (MSc, PhD)
- Known for: MOSFET (MOS transistor); Surface passivation; Thermal oxidation; PMOS and NMOS; MOS integrated circuit; Hardware security module
- Children: Bill Atalla
- Engineering career
- Discipline: Mechanical engineering; Electrical engineering; Electronic engineering; Security engineering
- Institutions: Bell Labs; Hewlett-Packard; Fairchild Semiconductor; Atalla Corporation
- Awards: National Inventors Hall of Fame; Stuart Ballantine Medal; Distinguished Alumnus; IEEE Milestones; IT Honor Roll

Mohamed M. Atalla (Arabic: محمد عطاالله; August 4, 1924 – December 30, 2009) was an Egyptian-American engineer, physicist, cryptographer, inventor and entrepreneur. He was a semiconductor pioneer who made important contributions to modern electronics. He is best known for inventing, along with his colleague Dawon Kahng, the MOSFET (metal–oxide–semiconductor field-effect transistor, or MOS transistor) in 1959. The invention, together with Atalla's earlier work on surface passivation, had a significant impact on the development of the electronics industry. He is also known as the founder of the data security company Atalla Corporation (now Utimaco Atalla), founded in 1972. He received the Stuart Ballantine Medal (now the Benjamin Franklin Medal in physics) and was inducted into the National Inventors Hall of Fame for his important contributions to semiconductor technology as well as data security.

Born in Port Said, Egypt, he was educated at Cairo University in Egypt and then Purdue University in the United States, before joining Bell Labs in 1949 and later adopting the more anglicized "John" or "Martin" M. Atalla as professional names. He made several important contributions to semiconductor technology at Bell Labs, including his development of the surface passivation process and his demonstration of the MOSFET with Kahng in 1959.

His work on MOSFET was initially overlooked at Bell, which led to his resignation from Bell and joining Hewlett-Packard (HP), founding its Semiconductor Lab in 1962 and then HP Labs in 1966, before leaving to join Fairchild Semiconductor, founding its Microwave & Optoelectronics division in 1969. His work at HP and Fairchild included research on Schottky diode, gallium arsenide (GaAs), gallium arsenide phosphide (GaAsP), indium arsenide (InAs) and light-emitting diode (LED) technologies. He later left the semiconductor industry, and became an entrepreneur in cryptography and data security. In 1972, he founded Atalla Corporation, and filed a patent for a remote Personal Identification Number (PIN) security system. In 1973, he released the first hardware security module, the "Atalla Box", which encrypted PIN and ATM messages, and went on to secure the majority of the world's ATM transactions. He later founded the Internet security company TriStrata Security in the 1990s. He died in Atherton, California, on December 30, 2009.

== Early life and education (1924–1949) ==
Mohamed Mohamed Atalla was born in Port Said, Kingdom of Egypt. He studied at Cairo University in Egypt, where he received his Bachelor of Science degree. He later moved to the United States to study mechanical engineering at Purdue University. There, he received his master's degree (MSc) in 1947 and his doctorate (PhD) in 1949, both in mechanical engineering. His MSc thesis was titled "High Speed Flow in Square Diffusers" and his PhD thesis was titled "High Speed Compressible Flow in Square Diffusers".

== Bell Telephone Laboratories (1949–1962) ==
After completing his PhD at Purdue University, Atalla was employed at Bell Telephone Laboratories (BTL) in 1949. In 1950, he began working at Bell's New York City operations, where he worked on problems related to the reliability of electromechanical relays, and worked on circuit-switched telephone networks. With the emergence of transistors, Atalla was moved to the Murray Hill lab, where he began leading a small transistor research team in 1956. Despite coming from a mechanical engineering background and having no formal education in physical chemistry, he proved himself to be a quick learner in physical chemistry and semiconductor physics, eventually demonstrating a high level of skill in these fields. He researched, among other things, the surface properties of silicon semiconductors and the use of silica as a protective layer of silicon semiconductor devices. He eventually adopted the pseudonyms "Martin" M. Atalla or "John" M. Atalla for his professional career.

Between 1956 and 1960, Atalla led a small team of several BTL researchers, including Eileen Tannenbaum, Edwin Joseph Scheibner and Dawon Kahng. They were new recruits at BTL, like himself, with no senior researchers on the team. Their work was initially not taken seriously by senior management at BTL and its owner AT&T, due to the team consisting of new recruits, and due to the team leader Atalla himself coming from a mechanical engineering background, in contrast to the physicists, physical chemists and mathematicians who were taken more seriously, despite Atalla demonstrating advanced skills in physical chemistry and semiconductor physics.

Despite working mostly on their own, Atalla and his team made significant advances in semiconductor technology. According to Fairchild Semiconductor engineer Chih-Tang Sah, the work of Atalla and his team during 1956–1960 was "the most important and significant technology advance" in silicon semiconductor technology.

=== Surface passivation by thermal oxidation ===
An initial focus of Atalla's research was to solve the problem of silicon surface states. At the time, the electrical conductivity of semiconductor materials such as germanium and silicon were limited by unstable quantum surface states, where electrons are trapped at the surface, due to dangling bonds that occur because unsaturated bonds are present at the surface. This prevented electricity from reliably penetrating the surface to reach the semiconducting silicon layer. Due to the surface state problem, germanium was the dominant semiconductor material of choice for transistors and other semiconductor devices in the early semiconductor industry, as germanium was capable of higher carrier mobility.

He made a breakthrough with his development of the surface passivation process. This is the process by which a semiconductor surface is rendered inert, and does not change semiconductor properties as a result of interaction with air or other materials in contact with the surface or edge of the crystal. The surface passivation process was first developed by Atalla in the late 1950s. He discovered that the formation of a thermally grown silicon dioxide (SiO_{2}) layer greatly reduced the concentration of electronic states at the silicon surface, and discovered the important quality of SiO_{2} films to preserve the electrical characteristics of p–n junctions and prevent these electrical characteristics from deteriorating by the gaseous ambient environment. He found that silicon oxide layers could be used to electrically stabilize silicon surfaces. He developed the surface passivation process, a new method of semiconductor device fabrication that involves coating a silicon wafer with an insulating layer of silicon oxide so that electricity could reliably penetrate to the conducting silicon below. By growing a layer of silicon dioxide on top of a silicon wafer, Atalla was able to overcome the surface states that prevented electricity from reaching the semiconducting layer. His surface passivation method was a critical step that made possible the ubiquity of silicon integrated circuits, and later became critical to the semiconductor industry. For the surface passivation process, he developed the method of thermal oxidation, which was a breakthrough in silicon semiconductor technology.

Atalla first published his findings in BTL memos during 1957, before presenting his work at an Electrochemical Society meeting in 1958, the Radio Engineers' Semiconductor Device Research Conference. The semiconductor industry saw the potential significance of Atalla's surface oxidation method, with RCA calling it a "milestone in the surface field." The same year, he made further refinements to the process with his colleagues Eileen Tannenbaum and Edwin Joseph Scheibner, before they published their results in May 1959. According to Fairchild Semiconductor engineer Chih-Tang Sah, the surface passivation process developed by Atalla and his team "blazed the trail" that led to the development of the silicon integrated circuit. Atalla's silicon transistor passivation technique by thermal oxide was the basis for several important inventions in 1959, of which included the MOSFET (MOS transistor) by Atalla and Dawon Kahng at Bell Labs and the planar process by Jean Hoerni at Fairchild Semiconductor.

=== MOSFET (MOS transistor) ===
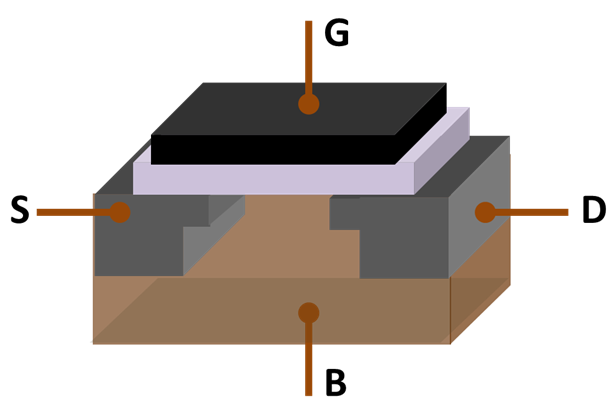
The MOSFET was invented by Atalla with his colleague Dawon Kahng in 1959, based on Atalla's earlier surface passivation and thermal oxidation processes.

Building on his earlier pioneering research on the surface passivation and thermal oxidation processes, Atalla developed the metal–oxide–semiconductor (MOS) process. Atalla then proposed that a field effect transistor–a concept first envisioned in the 1920s and confirmed experimentally in the 1940s, but not achieved as a practical device—be built of metal-oxide-silicon. Atalla assigned the task of assisting him to Dawon Kahng, a Korean scientist who had recently joined his group. That led to the invention of the MOSFET (metal–oxide–semiconductor field-effect transistor) by Atalla and Kahng, in November 1959. Atalla and Kahng first demonstrated the MOSFET in early 1960. With its high scalability, and much lower power consumption and higher density than bipolar junction transistors, the MOSFET made it possible to build high-density integrated circuit (IC) chips.

=== Nanolayer transistor ===
In 1960, Atalla and Kahng fabricated the first MOSFET with a gate oxide thickness of 100 nm, along with a gate length of 20 μm. In 1962, Atalla and Kahng fabricated a nanolayer-base metal–semiconductor junction (M–S junction) transistor. This device has a metallic layer with nanometric thickness sandwiched between two semiconducting layers, with the metal forming the base and the semiconductors forming the emitter and collector. With its low resistance and short transit times in the thin metallic nanolayer base, the device was capable of high operation frequency compared to bipolar transistors. Their pioneering work involved depositing metal layers (the base) on top of single crystal semiconductor substrates (the collector), with the emitter being a crystalline semiconductor piece with a top or a blunt corner pressed against the metallic layer (the point contact). They deposited gold (Au) thin films with a thickness of 10 nm on n-type germanium (n-Ge), while the point contact was n-type silicon (n-Si). Atalla resigned from BTL in 1962.

=== Schottky diode ===
Extending their work on MOS technology, Atalla and Kahng next did pioneering work on hot carrier devices, which used what would later be called a Schottky barrier. The Schottky diode, also known as the Schottky-barrier diode, was theorized for years, but was first practically realized as a result of the work of Atalla and Kahng during 1960–1961. They published their results in 1962 and called their device the "hot electron" triode structure with semiconductor-metal emitter. It was one of the first metal-base transistors. The Schottky diode went on to assume a prominent role in mixer applications.

== Hewlett-Packard (1962–1969) ==
In 1962, Atalla joined Hewlett-Packard, where he co-founded Hewlett-Packard and Associates (HP Associates), which provided Hewlett-Packard with fundamental solid-state capabilities. He was the Director of Semiconductor Research at HP Associates, and the first manager of HP's Semiconductor Lab.

He continued research on Schottky diodes with Robert J. Archer at HP Associates. They developed high vacuum metal film deposition technology, and fabricated stable evaporated/sputtered contacts, publishing their results in January 1963. A breakthrough in metal–semiconductor junction and Schottky barriers resulted, as it overcame most of the fabrication problems inherent in point-contact diodes and made it possible to build practical Schottky diodes.

At the Semiconductor Lab during the 1960s, he launched a material science investigation program that provided a base technology for gallium arsenide (GaAs), gallium arsenide phosphide (GaAsP) and indium arsenide (InAs) devices. These devices became the core technology used by HP's Microwave Division to develop sweepers and network analyzers that pushed 20–40 GHz frequency, giving HP more than 90% of the military communications market.

Atalla helped create HP Labs in 1966. He directed its solid-state division.

== Fairchild Semiconductor (1969–1972) ==
In 1969, he left HP and joined Fairchild Semiconductor. He was the vice president and general manager of the Microwave & Optoelectronics division, from its inception in May 1969 up until November 1971. He continued his work on light-emitting diodes (LEDs), proposing they could be used for indicator lights and optical readers in 1971. He later left Fairchild in 1972.

== Atalla Corporation (1972–1990) ==
He left the semiconductor industry in 1972, and began a new career as an entrepreneur in data security and cryptography. In 1972, he founded Atalla Technovation, later called Atalla Corporation, which dealt with safety problems of banking and financial institutions.

=== Hardware security module ===
He invented the first hardware security module (HSM), the so-called "Atalla Box", a security system that secures a majority of transactions from ATMs today. At the same time, Atalla contributed to the development of the personal identification number (PIN) system, which has developed among others in the banking industry as the standard for identification.

The work of Atalla in the early 1970s led to the use of hardware security modules. His "Atalla Box", a security system which encrypts PIN and ATM messages, and protected offline devices with an un-guessable PIN-generating key. He commercially released the "Atalla Box" in 1973. The product was released as the Identikey. It was a card reader and customer identification system, providing a terminal with plastic card and PIN capabilities. The system was designed to let banks and thrift institutions switch to a plastic card environment from a passbook program. The Identikey system consisted of a card reader console, two customer PIN pads, intelligent controller and built-in electronic interface package. The device consisted of two keypads, one for the customer and one for the teller. It allowed the customer to type in a secret code, which is transformed by the device, using a microprocessor, into another code for the teller. During a transaction, the customer's account number was read by the card reader. This process replaced manual entry and avoided possible key stroke errors. It allowed users to replace traditional customer verification methods such as signature verification and test questions with a secure PIN system.

A key innovation of the Atalla Box was the key block, which is required to securely interchange symmetric keys or PINs with other actors of the banking industry. This secure interchange is performed using the Atalla Key Block (AKB) format, which lies at the root of all cryptographic block formats used within the Payment Card Industry Data Security Standard (PCI DSS) and American National Standards Institute (ANSI) standards.

Fearful that Atalla would dominate the market, banks and credit card companies began working on an international standard. Its PIN verification process was similar to the later IBM 3624. Atalla was an early competitor to IBM in the banking market, and was cited as an influence by IBM employees who worked on the Data Encryption Standard (DES). In recognition of his work on the PIN system of information security management, Atalla has been referred to as the "Father of the PIN" and as a father of information security technology.

The Atalla Box protected over 90% of all ATM networks in operation as of 1998, and secured 85% of all ATM transactions worldwide as of 2006. Atalla products still secure the majority of the world's ATM transactions, as of 2014.

=== Online security ===
In 1972, Atalla filed U.S. patent 3,938,091 for a remote PIN verification system, which utilized encryption techniques to assure telephone link security while entering personal ID information, which would be transmitted as encrypted data over telecommunications networks to a remote location for verification. This was a precursor to telephone banking, Internet security and e-commerce.

At the National Association of Mutual Savings Banks (NAMSB) conference in January 1976, Atalla announced an upgrade to its Identikey system, called the Interchange Identikey. It added the capabilities of processing online transactions and dealing with network security. Designed with the focus of taking bank transactions online, the Identikey system was extended to shared-facility operations. It was consistent and compatible with various switching networks, and was capable of resetting itself electronically to any one of 64,000 irreversible nonlinear algorithms as directed by card data information. The Interchange Identikey device was released in March 1976. It was one of the first products designed to deal with online transactions, along with Bunker Ramo Corporation products unveiled at the same NAMSB conference. In 1979, Atalla introduced the first network security processor (NSP).

In 1987, Atalla Corporation merged with Tandem Computers. Atalla went into retirement in 1990.

As of 2013, 250 million card transactions are protected by Atalla products every day.

== TriStrata Security (1993–1999) ==
It was not long until several executives of large banks persuaded him to develop security systems for the Internet age. They were worried about the fact that no useful framework for electronic commerce would have been possible at that time without innovation in the computer and network security industry. Following a request from former Wells Fargo Bank president William Zuendt in 1993, Atalla began developing a new Internet security technology, allowing companies to scramble and transmit secure computer files, e-mail, and digital video and audio, over the internet.

As a result of these activities, he founded the company TriStrata Security in 1996. In contrast to most conventional computer security systems at the time, which built walls around a company's entire computer network to protect the information within from thieves or corporate spies, TriStrata took a different approach. Its security system wrapped a secure, encrypted envelope around individual pieces of information (such as a word processing file, a customer database, or e-mail) that can only be opened and deciphered with an electronic permit, allowing companies to control which users have access to this information and the necessary permits. It was considered a new approach to enterprise security at the time.

== Later years and death (2000–2009) ==
Atalla was the chairman of A4 System, as of 2003.

He lived in Atherton, California. Atalla died on December 30, 2009, in Atherton.

== Awards and honors ==
Atalla was awarded the Stuart Ballantine Medal (now the Benjamin Franklin Medal in physics) at the 1975 Franklin Institute Awards, for his important contributions to silicon semiconductor technology and his invention of the MOSFET. In 2003, Atalla received a Distinguished Alumnus doctorate from Purdue University.

In 2009, he was inducted into the National Inventors Hall of Fame for his important contributions to semiconductor technology as well as data security. He was referred to as one of the "Sultans of Silicon" along with several other semiconductor pioneers.

In 2014, the 1959 invention of the MOSFET was included on the list of IEEE milestones in electronics. In 2015, Atalla was inducted into the IT History Society's IT Honor Roll for his important contributions to information technology.
