= Utimaco Atalla =

Computer security vendor

Atalla
- Type: Privately owned
- Industry: Computer software Enterprise software Encryption / Cryptography; Hardware security modules Internet security
- Founded: 1973; 53 years ago
- Founder: Mohamed M. Atalla
- Headquarters: Campbell, California, USA
- Owner: Utimaco
- Website: hsm.utimaco.com

Utimaco Atalla, founded as Atalla Technovation and formerly known as Atalla Corporation or HP Atalla, is a security vendor, active in the market segments of data security and cryptography. Atalla provides government-grade end-to-end products in network security, and hardware security modules (HSMs) used in automated teller machines (ATMs) and Internet security. The company was founded by Egyptian engineer Mohamed M. Atalla in 1972. Atalla HSMs are part of the payment card industry, protecting 250 million card transactions daily as of 2013, and securing the majority of the world's ATM transactions as of 2014.

== Company history ==
=== 1970s ===
The company was originally founded in 1972, initially as Atalla Technovation, before it was later called Atalla Corporation. The company was founded by Dr. Mohamed M. Atalla, the inventor of the MOSFET (metal–oxide–semiconductor field-effect transistor). In 1972, Atalla filed U.S. patent 3,938,091 for a remote PIN verification system, which utilized encryption techniques to assure telephone link security while entering personal ID information, which would be transmitted as encrypted data over telecommunications networks to a remote location for verification.

He invented the first hardware security module (HSM), dubbed the "Atalla Box", a security system which encrypted PIN and ATM messages, and protected offline devices with an un-guessable PIN-generating key. He commercially released the "Atalla Box" in 1973. The product was released as the Identikey. It was a card reader and customer identification system, providing a terminal with plastic card and PIN capabilities. The system was designed to let banks and thrift institutions switch to a plastic card environment from a passbook program. The Identikey system consisted of a card reader console, two customer PIN pads, intelligent controller and built-in electronic interface package. The device consisted of two keypads, one for the customer and one for the teller. It allowed the customer to type in a secret code, which is transformed by the device, using a microprocessor, into another code for the teller. The Identikey system connected directly into the ATM without hardware or software changes, and was designed for easy operation by the teller and customer. During a transaction, the customer's account number was read by the card reader. This process replaced manual entry and avoided possible key stroke errors. It allowed users to replace traditional customer verification methods such as signature verification and test questions with a secure PIN system.

A key innovation of the Atalla Box was the key block, which is required to securely interchange symmetric keys or PINs with other actors of the banking industry. This secure interchange is performed using the Atalla Key Block (AKB) format, which lies at the root of all cryptographic block formats used within the Payment Card Industry Data Security Standard (PCI DSS) and American National Standards Institute (ANSI) standards.

Fearful that Atalla would dominate the market, banks and credit card companies began working on an international standard. The work of Atalla led to the use of high security modules. Its PIN verification process was similar to the later IBM 3624 system. Atalla was an early competitor to IBM in the banking market, and was cited as an influence by IBM employees who worked on the Data Encryption Standard (DES).

At the National Association of Mutual Savings Banks (NAMSB) conference in January 1976, Atalla announced an upgrade to its Identikey system, called the Interchange Identikey. It added the capabilities of processing online transactions and dealing with network security. Designed with the focus of taking bank transactions online, the Identikey system was extended to shared-facility operations. It was consistent and compatible with various switching networks, and was capable of resetting itself electronically to any one of 64,000 irreversible nonlinear algorithms as directed by card data information. The Interchange Identikey device was released in March 1976. It was one of the first products designed to deal with online transactions, along with Bunker Ramo Corporation products unveiled at the same NAMSB conference. In 1979, Atalla introduced the first network security processor (NSP). In recognition of his work on the PIN system of information security management, Atalla has been referred to as the "Father of the PIN" and as a father of information security technology.

=== 1980s–present ===
It merged in 1987 with Tandem Computers, who were then acquired by Compaq in 1997. The Atalla Box protected over 90% of all ATM networks in operation as of 1998, and secured 85% of all ATM transactions worldwide as of 2006. In 2001, HP acquired Compaq. In 2015, HP was divided into two companies, and the Atalla products were assigned to the newly formed Hewlett Packard Enterprise (HPE).

On September 7, 2016, HPE CEO Meg Whitman announced that the software assets of Hewlett Packard Enterprise, including Atalla, would be spun out and then merged with Micro Focus to create an independent company of which HP Enterprise shareholders would retain majority ownership. Micro Focus CEO Kevin Loosemore called the transaction "entirely consistent with our established acquisition strategy and our focus on efficient management of mature infrastructure products" and indicated that Micro Focus intended to "bring the core earnings margin for the mature assets in the deal - about 80 percent of the total - from 21 percent today to Micro Focus's existing 46 percent level within three years." The merger concluded on September 1, 2017.

On 18 May 2018, Utimaco, a German producer of hardware security modules, announced its intent to acquire the Atalla HSM and ESKM (Enterprise Secure Key Manager) business lines from Micro Focus. The venture received United States regulatory clearance in October 2018.

== Product overview ==
Atalla is a multi-chip embedded cryptographic module, which consists of a hardware platform, a firmware secure loader, and firmware. The purpose of the module is to load Approved application programs, also referred to as personalities, securely. The firmware monitors the physical security of the cryptographic module. Verification that the module is approved can be observed.

The Atalla security policy addresses the hardware and the firmware secure loader. This approach creates a security platform able to load secure code. Once control passes from the loader, the module is no longer operating in FIPS mode. Note: that no personality will have access to the module's secret keys. The cryptographic boundary of the ACS for the FIPS 140-2 Level 3 validation is the outer perimeter of the secure metal enclosure that encompasses all critical security components.
