= EPUAP =

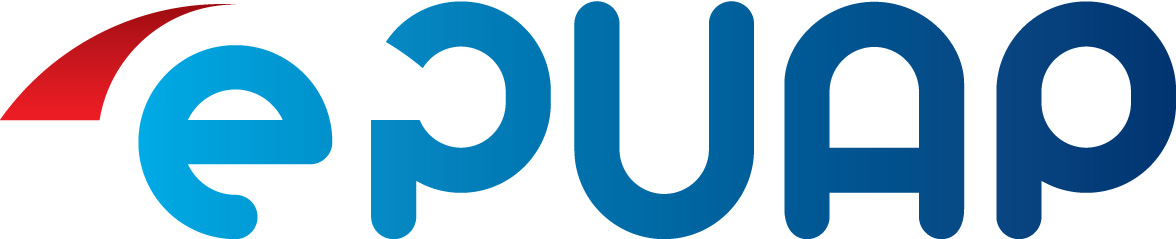
ePUAP logo

ePUAP (Electronic Platform of Public Administration Services) is a Polish nationwide platform for communication of citizens with public administrations in a uniform and standardized way. Built as part of the ePUAP-WKP project (State Informatization Plan). Service providers are public administration units and public institutions (especially entities that perform tasks commissioned by the state).

The platform provides service providers with technological infrastructure to provide services to citizens (recipients). Among the participants of ePUAP there are both central administration units and local governments, including municipal offices.

Among the services offered by ePUAP is also Profil Zaufany (Trusted Profile), which enables electronic filing with legal effect without the need to use a qualified signature and SAML-based single sign-on mechanism, which enables the same ePUAP account to log on to websites of various service providers.

The website www.epuap.gov.pl enables defining citizen and businesses service processes, creates channels of access to different systems of public administration and extends the package of public services provided electronically. Services available through the ePUAP platform may be accessed at the official website. Currently all administration services are available in Polish only.

== Overview ==
It is described by the Polish government as "a coherent and systematic action program designed and developed to allow public institutions make their electronic services available to the public". The platform provides citizens, businesses and institutions with a number of services intended to ensure smooth and safe communication between:

- customer to administrations (C2A),
- business to administration (B2A),
- administration to administration (A2A).

=== Main goals ===
The main project objectives are to create a single, secure and electronic access channel to public services for citizens, businesses and public administration and also to reduce time and lower the costs of sharing information resources and functionalities of administration domain systems.

Within the project, the following functionalities and services were delivered:

- Public services catalogue – a method of presenting and describing administration services,
- ePUAP platform – a web platform designed to provide public services on the Internet,
- Interoperability portal – a portal for experts working on recommendations for electronic documents and forms used within Polish administration systems to assure the uniformity of IT standards,
- Central Repository of Electronic Document Models – a database for valid document models and electronic forms.

== History and background ==
The ePUAP project was carried out in the years 2005–2008. Currently, a continuation project ePUAP2 is being carried out with the following objectives:

- to increase the number of online services available to the public including the registry services,
- to widen the scale of usage of public electronic services,
- to integrate subsequent systems of public administration and business on ePUAP portal,
- to define new processes of customer and business services.

=== ePUAP2 ===
ePUAP2 is a public and administrative project that extends the set of functional services developed during the first edition of the project and is another step in the process of transforming Poland into a modern and citizen-friendly country. The implementation period for the project covers the years 2009–2013.

Project financing The cost of the project “Construction of electronic Platform of Public Administration Services” – 32 million PLN was covered in 75% by the funds from the European Regional Development Fund (under the Sector Operational Programme "Supporting Competitiveness of Enterprises for the years 2004–2006"), while the remaining 25% of the cost was covered by a Polish national co-financing.

Funds for the ePUAP2 project were gained from the 7th priority axis of the Innovative Economy Operational Programme and amounts to 140 million PLN (85% of eligible expenses were covered by the European Regional Development Fund, 15% were covered by a national co-financing). The trustee of ePUAP is the Polish Ministry of the Interior and Administration.

== Legal regulations ==
According to the Polish law from 1 May 2008, public authorities are required to accept documents in electronic form (bringing applications and proposals and other activities in electronic form). ePUAP enables public institutions to meet this requirement by providing a service infrastructure to set up am electronic inbox. The ePUAP inbox meets legal requirements, in particular:

- issuing an official confirmation of receipt in accordance with the regulation of the Prime Minister of 29 September 2005 on the organizational and technical conditions for the delivery of electronic documents to public entities;
- cooperation with hardware security modules (HSM), meeting the technical requirements set out in the law;
- handling documents electronically in accordance with the minimum requirements set out in the Regulation of the Polish Council of Ministers of 11 October 2005 on minimum requirements for ICT systems.

== Incidents ==
=== Crashes ===
The ePUAP system very often happens smaller or larger failures. Because it is used to sign the application profiles trusted also in other electronic systems such as public administration. Electronic Services Platform created by ZUS, the system fault ePUAP it very difficult to settle official matters most electronically.

=== "Infoafera" ===
According to TVN and the release of TVP News from 10 April 2014, the creation of ePUAP is also associated with the so-called "Infoafera." On 10 April 2014, the Minister of Internal Affairs of Poland confirmed the information that the American technology company HP confessed to its participation in the Polish info-tour and corruption of Polish officials.

By March 2014, the construction of ePUAP and its maintenance cost PLN 98.4 million. PLN 67.8 million has been used for this project. Challenged expenses only on the portal itself is approx. PLN 20 million.
