= Personal identification number =

Numeric passcode for authentication

A personal identification number (PIN; sometimes redundantly a PIN code or PIN number) is a numeric (sometimes alpha-numeric) passcode used in the process of authenticating a user accessing a system.

The PIN has been the key to facilitating the private data exchange between different data-processing centers in computer networks for financial institutions, governments, and enterprises. PINs may be used to authenticate banking systems with cardholders, governments with citizens, enterprises with employees, and computers with users, among other uses.

In common usage, PINs are used in ATM or POS transactions, secure access control (e.g. computer access, door access, car access), internet transactions, or to log into a restricted website.

== History ==
The PIN originated with the introduction of the automated teller machine (ATM) in 1967, as an efficient way for banks to dispense cash to their customers. The first ATM system was that of Barclays in London, in 1967; it accepted cheques with machine-readable encoding, rather than cards, and matched the PIN to the cheque. In 1972, Lloyds Bank issued the first bank card to feature an information-encoding magnetic strip, using a PIN for security. James Goodfellow, the inventor who patented the first personal identification number, was awarded an OBE in the 2006 Queen's Birthday Honours.

Mohamed M. Atalla invented the first PIN-based hardware security module (HSM), dubbed the "Atalla Box," a security system that encrypted PIN and ATM messages and protected offline devices with an un-guessable PIN-generating key. In 1972, Atalla filed U.S. patent 3,938,091 for his PIN verification system, which included an encoded card reader and described a system that utilized encryption techniques to assure telephone link security while entering personal ID information that was transmitted to a remote location for verification.

He founded Atalla Corporation (now Utimaco Atalla) in 1972, and commercially launched the "Atalla Box" in 1973. The product was released as the Identikey. It was a card reader and customer identification system, providing a terminal with plastic card and PIN capabilities. The system was designed to let banks and thrift institutions switch to a plastic card environment from a passbook program. The Identikey system consisted of a card reader console, two customer PIN pads, intelligent controller and built-in electronic interface package. The device consisted of two keypads, one for the customer and one for the teller. It allowed the customer to type in a secret code, which is transformed by the device, using a microprocessor, into another code for the teller. During a transaction, the customer's account number was read by the card reader. This process replaced manual entry and avoided possible key stroke errors. It allowed users to replace traditional customer verification methods such as signature verification and test questions with a secure PIN system. In recognition of his work on the PIN system of information security management, Atalla has been referred to as the "Father of the PIN".

The success of the "Atalla Box" led to the wide adoption of PIN-based hardware security modules. Its PIN verification process was similar to the later IBM 3624. By 1998 an estimated 70% of all ATM transactions in the United States were routed through specialized Atalla hardware modules, and by 2003 the Atalla Box secured 80% of all ATM machines in the world, increasing to 85% as of 2006. Atalla's HSM products protect 250 million card transactions every day as of 2013, and still secure the majority of the world's ATM transactions as of 2014.

== Financial services ==
=== PIN usage ===
In the context of a financial transaction, usually both a private "PIN code" and public user identifier are required to authenticate a user to the system. In these situations, typically the user is required to provide a non-confidential user identifier or token (the user ID) and a confidential PIN to gain access to the system. Upon receiving the user ID and PIN, the system looks up the PIN based upon the user ID and compares the looked-up PIN with the received PIN. The user is granted access only when the number entered matches the number stored in the system. Hence, despite the name, a PIN does not personally identify the user. The PIN is not printed or embedded on the card but is manually entered by the cardholder during automated teller machine (ATM) and point of sale (POS) transactions (such as those that comply with EMV), and in card not present transactions, such as over the Internet or for phone banking.

=== PIN length ===
The international standard for financial services PIN management, ISO 9564-1, allows for PINs from four up to twelve digits, but recommends that for usability reasons the card issuer not assign a PIN longer than six digits. The inventor of the ATM, John Shepherd-Barron, had at first envisioned a six-digit numeric code, but his wife could only remember four digits, and that has become the most commonly used length in many places, although banks in Switzerland and many other countries require a six-digit PIN.

=== PIN validation ===
There are several main methods of validating PINs. The operations discussed below are usually performed within a hardware security module (HSM).

==== IBM 3624 method ====
One of the earliest ATM models was the IBM 3624, which used the IBM method to generate what is termed a natural PIN. The natural PIN is generated by encrypting the primary account number (PAN), using an encryption key generated specifically for the purpose. This key is sometimes referred to as the PIN generation key (PGK). This PIN is directly related to the primary account number. To validate the PIN, the issuing bank regenerates the PIN using the above method, and compares this with the entered PIN.

Natural PINs cannot be user selectable because they are derived from the PAN. If the card is reissued with a new PAN, a new PIN must be generated.

Natural PINs allow banks to issue PIN reminder letters as the PIN can be generated.

==== IBM 3624 + offset method ====
To allow user-selectable PINs it is possible to store a PIN offset value. The offset is found by subtracting the natural PIN from the customer selected PIN using modulo 10. For example, if the natural PIN is 1234, and the user wishes to have a PIN of 2345, the offset is 1111.

The offset can be stored either on the card track data, or in a database at the card issuer.

To validate the PIN, the issuing bank calculates the natural PIN as in the above method, then adds the offset and compares this value to the entered PIN.

==== VISA method ====
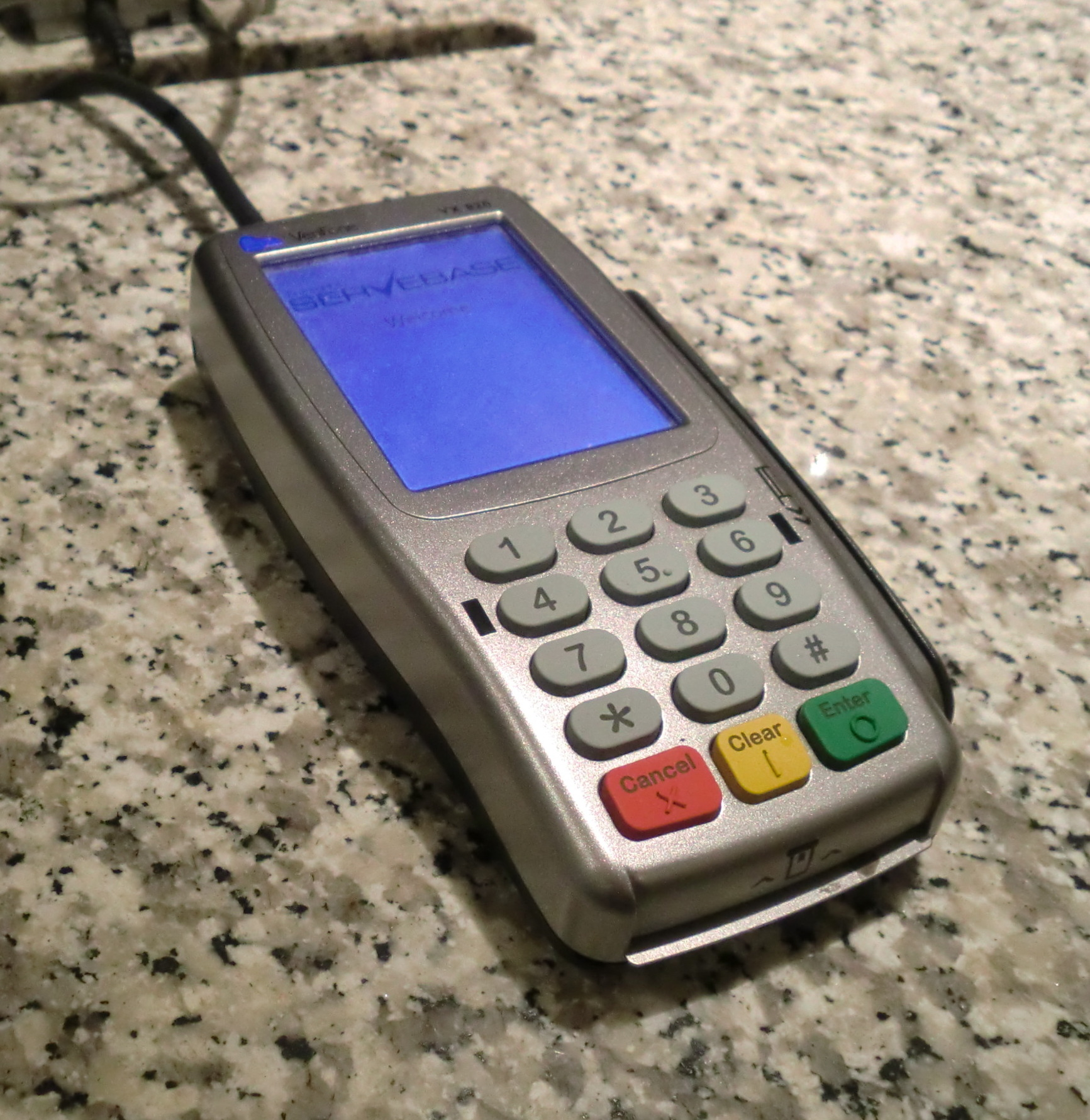
When using this credit card terminal, a VISA cardholder swipes or inserts their credit card, and enters their PIN on the keypad.

The VISA method is used by many card schemes and is not VISA-specific. The VISA method generates a PIN verification value (PVV). Similar to the offset value, it can be stored on the card's track data, or in a database at the card issuer. This is called the reference PVV.

The VISA method takes the rightmost eleven digits of the PAN excluding the checksum value, a PIN validation key index (PVKI, chosen from one to six, a PVKI of 0 indicates that the PIN cannot be verified through PVS) and the required PIN value to make a 64-bit number, the PVKI selects a validation key (PVK, of 128 bits) to encrypt this number. From this encrypted value, the PVV is found.

To validate the PIN, the issuing bank calculates a PVV value from the entered PIN and PAN and compares this value to the reference PVV. If the reference PVV and the calculated PVV match, the correct PIN was entered.

Unlike the IBM method, the VISA method does not derive a PIN. The PVV value is used to confirm the PIN entered at the terminal, was also used to generate the reference PVV. The PIN used to generate a PVV can be randomly generated, user-selected or even derived using the IBM method.

== PIN security ==
Financial PINs are often four-digit numbers in the range 0000–9999, resulting in 10,000 possible combinations. Switzerland issues six-digit PINs by default.

Some systems set up default PINs and most allow the customer to set up a PIN or to change the default one, and on some a change of PIN on first access is mandatory. Customers are usually advised not to set up a PIN based on their or their spouse's birthday, on driver license numbers, consecutive or repetitive numbers, or some other schemes. Some financial institutions do not give out or permit PINs where all digits are identical (such as 1111, 2222, ...), consecutive (1234, 2345, ...), numbers that start with one or more zeroes, or the last four digits of the cardholder's social security number or birth date.

Many PIN verification systems allow three attempts, thereby giving a card thief a putative 0.03% probability of guessing the correct PIN before the card is blocked. This holds only if all PINs are equally likely and the attacker has no further information available, which has not been the case with some of the many PIN generation and verification algorithms that financial institutions and ATM manufacturers have used in the past.

Research has been done on commonly used PINs. The result is that without forethought, a sizable portion of users may find their PIN vulnerable. "Armed with only four possibilities, hackers can crack 20% of all PINs. Allow them no more than fifteen numbers, and they can tap the accounts of more than a quarter of card-holders."

Breakable PINs can worsen with length, to wit:

The problem with guessable PINs surprisingly worsens when customers are forced to use additional digits, moving from about a 25% probability with fifteen numbers to more than 30% (not counting 7-digits with all those phone numbers). In fact, about half of all 9-digit PINs can be reduced to two dozen possibilities, largely because more than 35% of all people use the all too tempting 123456789. As for the remaining 64%, there's a good chance they're using their Social Security Number, which makes them vulnerable. (Social Security Numbers contain their own well-known patterns.)

=== Implementation flaws ===
In 2002, two PhD students at Cambridge University, Piotr Zieliński and Mike Bond, discovered a security flaw in the PIN generation system of the IBM 3624, which was duplicated in most later hardware. Known as the decimalization table attack, the flaw would allow someone who has access to a bank's computer system to determine the PIN for an ATM card in an average of 15 guesses.

== Reverse PIN hoax ==
Rumours have been in e-mail and Internet circulation claiming that in the event of entering a PIN into an ATM backwards, law enforcement will be instantly alerted as well as money being ordinarily issued as if the PIN had been entered correctly. The intention of this scheme would be to protect victims of muggings; however, despite the system being proposed for use in some US states, there are no ATMs currently in existence that employ this software.

== Mobile phone passcodes ==
A mobile phone may be PIN protected. If enabled, the PIN (also called a passcode) for GSM mobile phones can be between four and eight digits and is recorded in the SIM card. If such a PIN is entered incorrectly three times, the SIM card is blocked until a personal unblocking code (PUC or PUK), provided by the service operator, is entered. If the PUC is entered incorrectly ten times, the SIM card is permanently blocked, requiring a new SIM card from the mobile carrier service.

Note that this should not be confused with software-based passcodes that are often used on smartphones with lock screens: these are not related to the device's cellular SIM card, PIN and PUC.

== See also ==
- ATM SafetyPIN software
- Campus card
- Transaction authentication number
