= ATM controller =

System used to coordinate financial transactions

An ATM controller (ATMC) is a system used in financial institutions to route financial transactions between ATMs, core banking systems and other banks. An ATMC is sometimes referred to as an "EFTPOS Switch". (Note: EFTPOS stands for "electronic funds transfer at point of sale.") An ATM controller is key infrastructure in an interbank network.

== Operation ==
A message may enter an ATMC from an ATM, another ATMC or a third party. When receiving a message, the ATMC will examine the message, validate the PIN block if present, and then route the message according to the leading digits of the account number referenced.

This routing may be to a core banking system to check the available balances and to authorise the transaction, or to another bank's ATMC. For example, if a customer of Bank A used their card at an ATM belonging to Bank B, the message would be forwarded to Bank B's ATMC. The ATMC would examine the message, and based upon the account number determine that the appropriate ATMC to contact would be Bank A. It would then forward the message to Bank A's ATMC for authorisation.

An important aspect of an ATMC system is its ability to perform stand-in processing when core banking systems are unavailable. This allows a bank's ATMs to operate (usually with reduced limits) during periods of outage or maintenance on core banking systems. ATMCs make use of a SAF (store and forward) queue to ensure transactions are not lost.

An ATMC will usually have at least one attached hardware security module to manage the keys relating to PIN validation and encryption of connections.
