= ATM SafetyPIN software =

Potential alert system for forced ATM users

ATM SafetyPIN software is a software application that allows users of automated teller machines (ATMs) to alert law enforcement of a forced cash withdrawal (such as in a robbery) by entering their personal identification number (PIN) in reverse order. The system was patented by Illinois lawyer Joseph Zingher (U.S. patent 5,731,575).

SafetyPIN is not currently used in ATM systems, despite widely circulated rumors originating from a chain letter e-mail. This is mainly due to issues regarding palindrome PINs being incompatible with the system and potential security vulnerabilities that could arise if implemented.

== History ==
The concept of a backup emergency PIN system, or duress code, for ATM systems has been around since at least July 30, 1986, when Representative Mario Biaggi, a former police officer, proposed it in the U.S. Congressional Record, pp. 18232 et seq. Biaggi then proposed House Resolution 785 in 1987 which would have had the FBI track the problem of express kidnappings and evaluate the idea of an emergency PIN system. HR785 died in committee without debate.

Zingher has not been successful in marketing licenses for his patent. Police in New York, New Jersey, Ohio, Illinois, and Kansas have supported the concept. Police support prompted the Illinois legislature to pass a law making it mandatory on all ATMs in Illinois. The law was changed shortly after it was passed by a "follow-on" bill that changed the meaning to the exact opposite of what they were seeking.

In 2006, an e-mail chain letter hoax circulated that claimed a reverse PIN duress code system is in place universally. American Banker reported on January 2, 2007, that no PIN-reversal duress code is used on any ATM as of that date. In September 2013 the hoax was still circulating in Australia with the text:

If you should ever be forced by a robber to withdraw money from an ATM, you can notify the police by entering your PIN in reverse. For example if your PIN is 1234 then you would put in 4321. The ATM recognizes that your PIN is backwards from the ATM card you placed in the machine. The machine will still give you the money you requested, but unknown to the robber, the police will be immediately dispatched to help you. This information was recently broadcast on TV and it states that it is seldom used because people don't know it exists. Please pass this along to everyone possible. Australian Federal Police. AFP Web site: https://www.afp.gov.au

The same kind of e-mail chain letter hoax is still circulated on Tumblr and Facebook, as well as in India and other parts of the world.

Were the system implemented, palindromic PINs such as 5555 or 2112 would then be unavailable so that false alarms would not occur. Moreover, PINs that are semi-reversible such as 5255 or 1241, where the first and last numbers are the same, would be something to avoid as well so that accidental alarms would not be triggered by mistakenly switching the middle numbers.

Diebold, a manufacturer of ATMs, states on their website that no such emergency alerting system is currently in use. They cite an article in the St. Louis Post-Dispatch which claims bankers oppose the reverse-PIN system out of concerns that "ATM users might hesitate or fumble while trying to enter their PINs backwards under duress, possibly increasing the chances of violence." Diebold further states that they would be willing to support such technology if their customers (presumably banks) request it.

A bill making the reverse emergency PIN system mandatory on all ATMs in the state of Illinois was proposed on February 10, 2009. Subsection (i) is the new bill.

i) A terminal operated in this State must be designed and programmed so that when a consumer enters his or her personal identification number in reverse order, the terminal automatically sends an alarm to the local law enforcement agency having jurisdiction over the terminal location. The Commissioner shall promulgate rules necessary for the implementation of this subsection (i).

In 2009, Los Angeles City Councilman Greig Smith announced his intention to make the ReversePIN system mandatory on all ATMs in the city.
