= Billing descriptor =

Identifying text on credit card statement

A billing descriptor is the text displayed on a cardholder's credit card statement to identify the merchant and the transaction. It typically includes the merchant's business name, and may incorporate a phone number, product/service category, or order reference. It is intended to assist cardholders in recognizing a charge and thereby reduce disputes and chargebacks caused by unrecognized transactions.

Billing descriptors typically use a merchant’s trading or brand name rather than the formal legal entity name to improve consumer recognition. In certain payment processing systems, a temporary soft descriptor or a dynamic descriptor may be used. These formats can include additional details such as a service name or order reference, and they appear at different stages of transaction settlement. Dynamic descriptors are used by some merchants offering multiple services or products under different brand names (such as payment processors, software-as-a-service platforms, or subscription services) where customers may recognize the specific service name rather than the parent company.

== Static descriptors ==
If the company provides a single service or product, a simple billing descriptor like "ZXC Services & Products 800-123-4567" is typical.

== Dynamic descriptors ==
Dynamic descriptors allow the description field on the cardholder's statement to be modified with more details about the transaction or specific order references. The merchant's name is often abbreviated to three letters, followed by an asterisk (*) and a brief description of the service or product provided. Billing descriptor character limits vary by payment processor and card network (typically 20–30 characters); most U.S.-based processors enforce a 25-character maximum, which must accommodate the merchant name, asterisk, descriptor text, and phone number. For example, a dynamic descriptor could be "ZXC* Site Access 800-123-4567."

== See also ==
- Merchant services
- Credit card terminal
- Credit card fraud
- Chargeback insurance
