= Card transaction data =

Information sent when purchasing with card

Card transaction data is financial data generally collected through the transfer of funds between a card holder's account and a business's account. It consists of the use of either a debit card or a credit card to generate data on the transfer for the purchase of goods or services. Transaction data describes an action composed of events in which master data participates. Transaction focuses on the price, discount and method of payment interaction between the customer and the organization. They are based on volatility as each transaction data changes every time a purchase is made, one time it could be $10, the next $55. Since debit and credit cards are commonly used to pay for goods and services, they represent a strong percentage of the consumption expenditure in the country.

== Overview ==
When a transaction is made, the card holder is offered a paper or electronic transaction record containing information about the purchase. This includes: transaction amount, transaction number, transaction date and time, transaction type (deposits, withdrawal, purchase or refund), type of account being debited or credited, card number, identity of the card acceptor (organization/store address) as well as the identity of the terminal (company name from which the machine operates). The use of debit cards in 2014 increased by 18% from the 2011 total volume of Canadian Payment Methods. As for credit cards, it increased by 26% from the 2011 total volume of Canadian Payment Methods. These two types of payment methods combined make up for more transactions than cash. Card transaction data has increased through the expansion of payment channels available to customers. Additionally, incentive and reward programs have increased the use of electronic cards for their benefits. The use of contactless and e-commerce payment has also allowed for a growth in card transaction data to increase due to the simplicity of the transaction. The use of Interac Debit transactions have increased rapidly in the last six years according to Interac Debit statistics. However, Canada has a lower rate debit use transactions by inhabitant in comparison to the United States, Sweden, Netherlands, Australia, and Great Britain.

=== Credit cards ===
Terminal processes of credit card transactions:

- Purchase
- Purchase-void
- Refund
- Refund-void
- Pre-authorization
- Private label payment
- Private label payment-void
- Note: Terminals process pre-paid credit cards the same as standard credit cards

Type of credit cards:

- Standard (MasterCard, Visa, Discover, AMEX)
- Pre-paid (MasterCard, Visa, Discover, AMEX)
- Corporate (purchasing) cards (as long as it is a processable standard card, i.e. standard Visa means corporate Visa cards are processable)
- Private label cards (depending on the terms of agreement between the company's financial terminal data generator

=== Debit cards ===
Terminal processes of debit card transactions:

- Purchase
- Purchase-void
- Refund
- Refund-void
- Some debit chips may also allow:
  - pre-authorized
  - private label payment
  - private label payment-void
- Note: debit card-holder must input their own PIN to complete transaction

Point of sale terminals will give access to information

== Transaction descriptors and merchant identification ==
Card transaction records include data used by participants in the payment processing system, including merchants, acquirers, payment networks and issuers. One field that may be transmitted is a billing descriptor, also referred to in payment-processing documentation as a merchant descriptor or statement descriptor. It is the merchant description displayed on the cardholder's statement.

Billing descriptors are used to identify a merchant or transaction to the cardholder and are displayed according to rules and formats defined by the payment network and the payment processor. The format and content of a descriptor can vary according to the payment network, processor and transaction type. Visa guidance specifies requirements for the merchant name and the information used to identify a merchant to the cardholder.

As a result, the descriptor shown to the cardholder may not be identical to the merchant's consumer-facing trading name. It may be abbreviated or include supplementary information specified by the relevant payment-processing rules.

The information displayed to the cardholder may not uniquely identify the business associated with a transaction. Variations in merchant names and transaction descriptions can create a matching problem for systems that attempt to identify the underlying merchant. Merchant identification from card transaction data has been studied as a classification and machine-learning problem.

Financial institutions and data providers may apply post-processing techniques to transaction records to identify merchants and classify transactions.

=== Merchant identification and transaction enrichment ===
Financial institutions and specialised data providers may process transaction records to identify the merchant associated with a payment and add contextual information to the original transaction data. Mastercard describes this type of processing as transaction enrichment, in which transaction data can be standardised, categorised and supplemented with information about merchants and other entities.

Transaction enrichment may involve matching a transaction descriptor or merchant identifier to a known merchant record, resolving variations in business names, and distinguishing between entities associated with a transaction. Depending on the data available and the purpose of the processing, the resulting record may include a standardised merchant name, business category, geographic location, brand or other merchant attributes.

The enriched information can be used to present transaction records in a more recognisable format, support transaction categorisation and provide additional context about spending. It may also be used in systems that analyse transaction histories or classify transactions according to the merchant or type of purchase.

== Uses ==
Transaction data, especially for credit card use is being turned into a revenue stream and being sold for digital advertising and other marketing efforts by many credit card companies. This is not always clear or shared between the companies and their consumers. When asked, Google refuses to disclose who and how these data are being analyzed. Information is shown that their undisclosed partner companies had access to 70 percent of transactions for credit and debit cards in the United States. The data collected is often kept anonymous and aggregate yet it can still define users within a specific ZIP code region for certain types purchases. This information allows for an analysis of the type of consumers found within a specific region and if there are any similarities. This information is then beneficial to companies or stores as it provides data on the kind of consumer they are targeting and how to be successful to increase their revenue in sales. Allowing for statistics to be gathered and marketing targeted in a more broad manner rather than based on consumer's personal transactions. Due to privacy concerns, companies such as MasterCard have refrained from sharing more detailed data on a more individual basis. Some companies such as MasterCard are planning on combining their card transaction data with purchase history and loyalty cards. Allowing for a more defined collection of statistical data of consumer buying and spending habits, this data is collected from real purchases which makes it reliable.

=== Card transaction data levels ===
Some companies such as PayPal offer an incentive rates program for merchants who offer more detailed information on their sales transactions. They are only eligible for merchants who comply with Level 2 or Level 3 transactions, transactions that fall under Level 1 qualify as a normal card transaction. To ensure that data being shared is accurate, card companies perform strict verification of data being collected at either Level 2 or 3, therefore only accurate information is eligible for incentive rates being offered by card issuers. This is another form of collecting card transaction data that can be more individualized as it is completed by the merchant after the transaction has been made. The levels refer to the amount of transaction data submitted for the card, the higher the level the more data is needed to be reported.

Level requirements usually differ between companies but are similar to the following offered by PayPal:

==== Level 1 ====
- Any merchant who accepts credit cards complies with this level. It functions as a normal credit card and is authorized and associated with normal transaction data.

==== Level 2 ====
- Additional data regarding the actual sales such as tax, customer code, purchase number, invoice number etc. is captured at the point of sale. Most of the time it is combined with the merchants information such as Tax ID number, state and postal code data.

==== Level 3 ====
- Significant additional information on the actual product or service is shared such as line items, product codes, item description, unit price and quantities as well as shipping postal code data are needed in addition to the Level 2 requirements.

== Advantages for business ==
The marketing industry claims that sharing card transaction data can be beneficial to consumers as it allows for card companies and merchants to provide better products and services tailored to them directly. This may result in favourable products or services for the consumer, however it tends to increase spending habits. It is also claimed that less mass marketing is done and instead only specific groups that are susceptible to the advertisements will be targeted. Businesses benefit enormously, often at the expense of consumer privacy, as this type of information is useful for identifying promising areas of growth, enhance direct marketing response rates, and improve retention of existing customers. Exposing payment and spending trends can offer more opportunity for revenue growth as well as for consumer experiences in stores and online.

== Privacy concerns ==
Keeping this type of data anonymous is a challenge for debit and credit card companies who share the information with third parties. Metadata with certain properties, especially a geographical location attached are hard to keep unsourced. Other patterns of behaviour are also unique enough on their own to identify individuals to using metadata, indicating that complete anonymity is impossible. As more information becomes available and is tagged by people's consuming behaviour, this will only get harder to do. The standards for protection and enforcement against the release of this metadata varies among OECD member nations. The United States does not have any enforced national law for reporting consumer data breaches.
