= IBM banking equipment =

Early banking specific computer equipment

IBM designed, manufactured and sold banking equipment such as branch teller terminals and automatic teller machines (ATMs) from the late 1960s until 1998 when they exited the banking hardware market by selling their ATM business to Diebold. The product families described here are listed in roughly chronological order.

== Background ==
In the late 1960s banks began exploring branch automation as computers became more economical and terminal technology evolved. This adoption accelerated during the 1970s and IBM viewed this as a major business opportunity. In 1976, in the USA alone, they identified 14,000 commercial banks, 5,100 savings and loan associations and 500 mutual savings banks as targets for this technology.

IBM chose to develop, manufacture and sell a wide range of solutions for this market, which this article introduces in roughly chronological order.

== IBM 3940 Terminal ==
IBM Hursley began developing the IBM 3940 in 1964. Bank staff used these terminals to produce paper tape transaction records which were then sent to the head office by van or transmitted over modem lines. There was a model 1 and a model 2. Terminals were sold to a number of UK banks including Lloyds, Barclays and National Provincial Bank. The terminal was a desk-height cabinet with a modified typewriter on the left for data entry and a punch tape machine on the right that outputted the tapes.

== IBM 3980 Bank Teleprocessing System ==
This terminal based banking system was used by several banks in the United Kingdom as part of initial branch computerisation. Bank branch staff could use the equipment to enter customer transactions directly into the central computer through terminals attached to a form of mini-computer called a concentrator. IBM Hursley UK developed the system and manufactured it at their Greenock plant in Scotland. Development began in 1967.

The system was used by Lloyds Bank to establish the first online bank branch in the UK at Newcastle-upon-Tyne in October 1968. The success of the system encouraged Lloyds to expand the number of computerised branches, so that by November 1970 they had around 800 branches using the IBM 3980 system with the remaining branches punching transactions into paper tapes with IBM 3940s the majority of which were modem attached (with some branches still sending the tapes to a computer center by van). Lloyd's goal was to computerise all branches before England converted to decimal currency on 15 February 1971.

Halifax Building Society was reported in 1976 as having connected 250 of their 3982 terminals using 24 x IBM 3981 concentrators to an IBM 370/145 mainframe. The Bank of Scotland was quoted in 1978 as saying they had 400 x IBM 3980 terminals attached to two IBM 370/158s.

The 3980 system consisted of the following components:

=== IBM 3981 Computing Concentrator ===
The concentrator is used to connect remote terminals via a modem to a mainframe. It has 8 KB of magnetic core memory and a reel to reel tape drive all integrated into a tall cabinet. Earlier models could only support 10 terminals while later models could handle 14 remote and two local terminals.

=== IBM 3982 Keyboard Terminal ===
A data entry terminal, sometimes called a printing terminal that attaches to an IBM 3981. It was released in models 1 and 2. It is a teletype-like terminal integrated into a desk.

== IBM 2730 Transaction Validation Terminal ==
IBM announced the 2730 model 1 on February 24, 1971 as part of one of the first Magnetic Credit Card Service Centres in the world. The 2730 was a terminal designed to read magnetic stripe cards at point of sale. It has a keypad with 12 keys and a selling price of $515 USD.

As an example, in the early 1970s, First Federal Savings & Loan Association of Lincoln, Nebraska deployed IBM 2730 terminals in two Hinky Dinky supermarkets, allowing customers to make deposits and withdrawals or pay for purchases on the spot without visiting a bank branch which at the time was very novel. The customer needed a magnetic stripe card which the store operator would swipe through a reader along with the store's own authorisation card. They would enter a pass code and transaction code, and the terminal would transmit the request over a dial-up line to the bank's IBM System/370 Model 135, which verified the account, generated a one-time validation number, and communicated the approval back via audio response. It was described as one of the first of its type in the USA, allowing the supermarket to debit a customer account directly at time and point of sale without using cash or a cheque.

In 1974 it was reported that New York's Chase Manhattan Bank installed over 100 IBM 2730 terminals into retail outlets in the "Greater Metropolitan Area".

== IBM 3670 Brokerage Communication System ==
While not targeted at banks, the IBM 3670 product system was a finance industry specific offering aimed at brokerage firms. Announced on 21 September 1971, with first customer shipment occurring in October 1973. It consists of a number of products:

- IBM 3671 Shared Terminal Control Unit. The control unit can attach up to 12 applications-oriented executive consoles and 12 data displays, expandable to 24 executive consoles and 24 ·data displays with the Display Expansion feature. A Printer-Keyboard Attachment feature allows attachment of up to 8 printer-keyboards. It holds the distinction of being the first IBM device that was announced with the new highly successful 8 inch "Igar" diskette drive that IBM had developed in its Boulder lab, internally referred to as a 33FD, although it then eventuated that the IBM 3740 was the first IBM product that actually shipped with one in May 1973.
- IBM 3672 Executive Console. A large keyboard with 178 keys that offer a significant number of stock trading related functions.
- IBM 3673 Data Display. A CRT desk-top display that can present 1200 characters, in a format 40 characters wide by 30 lines high.
- IBM 3674 Printer-Keyboard. A modified multi-purpose IBM Selectric typewriter that can be used as a printer, a data entry device and as a typewriter.

The system is designed to allow branch offices of a brokerage firm to make inquires, enter orders, and perform record keeping through a control unit remotely attached to an IBM System/360 or IBM System/370. All products were withdrawn on 14 April 1975.

== IBM 2984 Cash Issuing Terminal ==
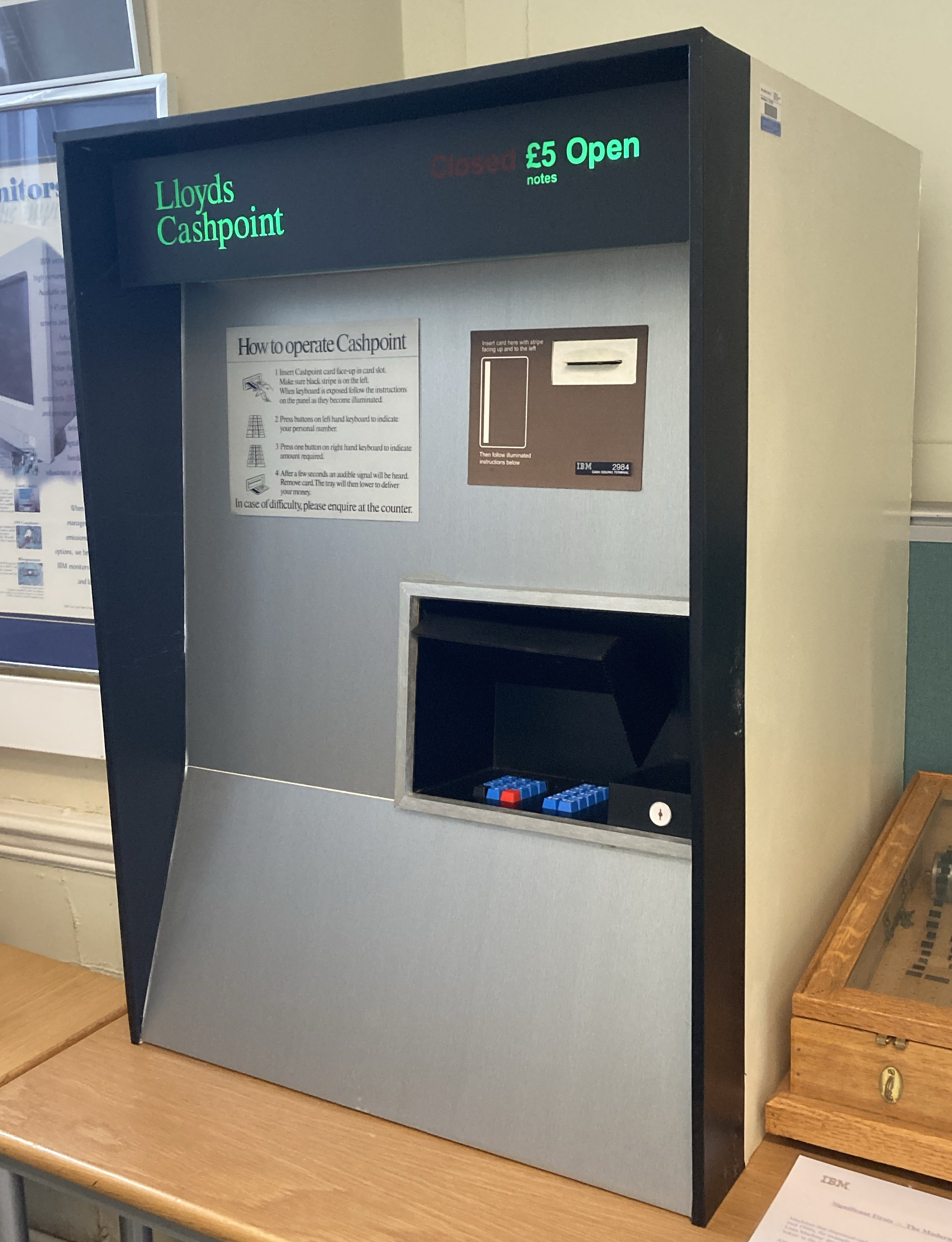
IBM 2984 Cash Issuing Terminal

The IBM 2984 Cash Issuing Terminal was designed at the request of Lloyds Bank, who branded it a "Cashpoint". It was developed by IBM Hursley in the United Kingdom using hardware initially designed by IBM in Raleigh NC. Installations began in 1972 and by 1978, Lloyds had deployed 670 terminals. They reported at the time they were using them to process over 200,000 paperless withdrawals per week totalling approximately five million pounds in cash.

The terminal accepted bank issued cards and required customers to enter a personal identification number (PIN), which at the time was a relatively new authentication method for consumers. The PIN and account data encoded on the card's magnetic stripe were transmitted to the bank's host computer for validation. The term "Cashpoint" became so widely adopted that it entered common usage in England as a generic word for any ATM.

The encryption system used in the 2984 was derived from a cipher algorithm created by IBM cryptographer Horst Feistel. Lloyds Bank executives were worried about the banks confidential data being read by wire-taping of the phone lines being used by the 2984, so researchers in IBM's Systems Communications Division adapted this algorithm so that each transaction's dispensing commands varied unpredictably, preventing attackers from recording and replaying instructions. According to IBM this encryption work became the basis for IBM's subsequent entry into the commercial cryptography market during the 1970s.

== IBM 3600 Finance Communication System ==
The IBM 3600 Finance Communication System was announced on 10 August 1973 and was an early example of an integrated network of banking devices. The system combined a branch computer controller with a family of devices such as banking terminals, printers and ATMs all connected via a loop-based communications architecture. The system was developed at IBM's Systems Communications Division (SCD) in Kingston, New York with support from the IBM Advanced Systems Development Division, Los Gatos and the IBM San Jose Special Engineering operation.

The 3600 was announced alongside other IBM vertical industry systems, including the IBM 3650 Retail Store System, the IBM 3660 Supermarket System, and the IBM 3790 communications system, the combination of which IBM described as a "revolution in terminal based systems". First customer shipments of the 3600 system began in November 1974. All of these systems relied on a significant number of developments across IBM:

- New chips: Large Scale Integration allowed advanced Field Effect Transistor logic chips that packed far more transistors onto a new metalized one-inch square ceramic substrate
- Gas panels: Developed as an alternative to cathode ray tubes, the neon argon gas panel provided clear and flicker-free images.
- Modem communications: Synchronous Data Link Control provided lower-cost communications over telephone lines
- New disks: The “Gulliver” disk file that supplied a hard drive smaller than three cubic feet and also the “Igar" diskette drive
- Smaller printers: A disk printer system called "spica" that used a rotating disk print element with engraved print elements that are struck by a single hammer as the disk rotates
- Belt printers: A new system, known as “Lynx,” using a removable belt that was significantly cheaper, quieter and simpler than earlier chain printers
- Keyboards: New keyboard technology called “Calico” that could build a wide variety of keyboards using common manufacturing facilities
- Power supplies: Transistorised Switching Regulators or TsRs: compact power supplies that are one third to one-fourth the size of previous generations

It was succeeded in 1981 by the IBM 4700 Finance Communication System, which offered faster processing and additional work station configurations, though the 3600's communications protocols and device interfaces remained in use long after the hardware was superseded.

Early customers included:

- The United Building Society in South Africa who deployed 680 IBM 3600 workstations handling 2.5 million transactions per month
- In Canada, all five large national banks ordered the IBM 3600 System.
- The Bank of Nova Scotia, with 900 branches, and the Toronto Dominion Bank with 850 branches, together ordered more than 2,500 IBM 3600 terminals
- Banco Comercial de Mexico (Commerex), with 48 branches oreded one hundred 3600s
- Takugin, one of the largest banks in Japan, ordered 1,200 IBM terminals, including 300 IBM 3600 teller terminals
- Hollywood Federal Savings and Loan Association located in Broward County Florida introduced a system called Bill-O-Matic that allowed customers to automate payment of 5000 bills per week. They worked with 16 local supermarkets implement point of sale terminals which allowed supermarket customers to make withdrawals and pay for groceries without checks or cash. They installed 105 IBM 3600 banking terminals encouraging customers to convert from passbooks to plastic cards, taking in 10,000 passbooks and issued 20,000 cards to old and new customers combined out of 60,000 depositors.

Using new banking technology like this allowed branch staff to update, retrieve, and enter customer records on-line, with transactions processed against the central database in real time rather than batched for overnight processing. The 3601 also allowed branches to continue computer processing of transactions in an offline manner. This combination of on-line real-time processing with off-line data entry increased operational efficiency for financial institutions and helped establish networked branch banking.

=== Loop connection ===

The 3600 architecture uses a simple form of networking called a loop, that effectively creates a daisy-chain with a cable running from the 'out' port on a loop adapter in the controller, to the first device in the loop (either a terminal, a printer or an ATM) and from there to the second device and so on. The last device in the loop then connects back to the 'in' port of the loop card in the same controller. Data can only travel around the loop in a single direction. Each device on the loop uses switches to set its terminal address (from 0 to 15) and its loop speed (either 600, 1200, 2400 or 4800 bits per second), although all devices on the same loop needed to be set to the same speed.

The following devices were announced as part of the 3600 system:

=== Communication Controllers ===
The Communication Controller is the programmable control unit normally located at a bank branch or other remote location where multiple devices need to be attached.

==== IBM 3601 Finance Communication Controller ====
The IBM 3601 contains up to 40 KB of programmable storage and an integrated data file on a removable diskette for storage of controller data, user programs, and customer data. The controller manages all attached terminal functions, controls data transmission between the terminals and the host processor, and can operate independently when the CPU is unavailable — capturing data from terminals, executing arithmetic operations, and storing transactions on disk for later transmission.

Key features include:

- One standard loop with up to five additional loops available as special features
- Support for local loops at 1,200, 2,400, or 4,800 bit/s, and remote loops at 1,200 bit/s via integrated modem
- Communication with the host processor over SDLC via an integrated 1,200 bit/s modem or external modems at up to 4,800 bit/s
- Off-line operation with transaction capture and disk-based data storage
- Configuration and Parameter Generation (CPGEN) facilities for defining work station arrangements, keyboard layouts, and device assignments

==== IBM 3602 Finance Communication Controller ====
The 3602 was announced 30 March 1976 and withdrawn 1 May 1984. It has two models:

- Model 1A has a 5.2 MB hard disk as well as a double sided diskette drive.
- Model 1B has a 9.3 MB hard disk as well as a double sided diskette drive.

==== IBM 3603 Terminal Attachment Unit ====
The 3603 provides an interface to a modem either for an 3601/3602 or when installed in a remote site for a remote sub-loop of terminals. The 3603 was announced 15 July 1975 and withdrawn August 1987.

=== Terminals ===
IBM offered a number of terminals for bank staff to perform banking related transactions.

==== IBM 3604 Keyboard Display ====
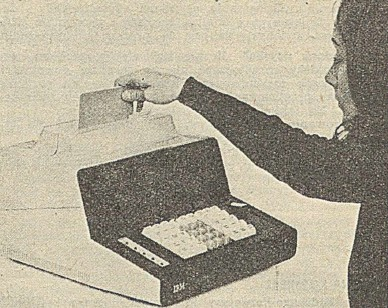
IBM 3604 with mag stripe reader

The IBM 3604 Keyboard Display is an interactive terminal used by bank tellers to perform banking operations. A variety of keyboard options are available, including numeric, alphanumeric, and expanded function key layouts. The 3604 can optionally be equipped with a magnetic stripe reader, enabling it to read and/or encode magnetic stripes either on a banking id/credit card or a bank passbook. IBM sold rolls of 500 magnetic stripes which could be used in a branch to adhere into an existing passbook. An example of the mag stripe reader can be seen at the top of the device in the image of the 3604.

There were seven models:

- Model 1 announced 10 August 1973 and withdrawn August 1987. It features a 240-character gas-panel display that displays in six rows of 40 characters.
- Model 2 announced 10 August 1973 and withdrawn August 1987. It features a 240-character gas-panel display that displays in six rows of 40 characters.
- Model 3 announced 11 August 1975. It features a 480-character gas-panel display that displays in twelve rows of 40 characters.
- Model 4 announced 11 August 1975. It features a 1024-character gas-panel display that displays in sixteen rows of 64 characters.
- Model 5 announced 30 March 1976. It features a 120-character gas-panel display that displays in three rows of 40 characters.
- Model 6 announced 30 March 1976 and withdrawn 5 February 1985. It features a 240-character gas-panel display that displays in six rows of 40 characters.
- Model 7 announced 8 March 1979. Has a CRT with a low glare screen that displays 1,920 characters in 80 x 24 row format.

==== IBM 3606 Financial Services Terminal ====
The 3606 is a small terminal device that is used in a financial setting or in a point of sale. It has an 8 position numeric display, a numeric keyboard with function keys and a magnetic stripe reader. It comes in two models:

- Model 1 announced 15 July 1975 and withdrawn 5 February 1985. It loop attaches to a 3601/3602 or to a remote loop using a 3603.
- Model 2 announced 1 May 1976 and withdrawn 5 February 1985. It only attaches to a 3601/3602 remote loop.

==== IBM 3608 Printing Financial Services Terminal ====
The 3608 is similar to a 3606 but also has a built in printer which made it taller. The printer can print 3 lines of text using a 45-character set. The document is inserted into a chute on the right side of the terminal and ejected out the left side after printing.

- Model 1 announced 15 July 1975 and withdrawn 5 February 1985. It loops attaches to a 3601/3602 or to a remote loop using a 3603
- Model 2 announced 5 November 1976 and withdrawn 5 February 1985. It only attaches to a 3601/3602 remote loop

IBM 3608 could be used to authorize credit card transactions in retail stores. As an example, in 1978 The First National Bank of Chicago (which at that time held $20 billion in assets and was one of the top 10 banks in the USA) used 200 remotely attached IBM 3608s at 125 stores to do online authorization of credit card transaction at time of sale. Their plan at that time was to install up to 5,000 more across 2,800 retail outlets.

=== Document Printers ===
A variety of printers were released to create hard-copies of banking transactions, print updates into banking passbooks and print on a journal roll. They all offer a shared terminal feature printer that allows the printer to be shared between two bank terminals using push buttons. Models include:

==== IBM 3610 Document Printer ====
A compact table-top printer that creates hard-copies of banking transactions. The print wheel can print at 10 characters per inch across 80 print positions, at speeds of 15 cps (with a 64-character set) or up to 30 cps (with a 96-character set). Models 1-3 were announced on 10 August 1973. Model 4 was announced 30 March 1976.

- Model 1 prints on cut forms only
- Model 2 prints on cut forms and also has a journal/audit roll
- Model 3 prints on cut forms and on fanfold paper.
- Model 4 prints on cut forms and also has a journal/audit roll

==== IBM 3611 Passbook printer ====
A compact table-top printer for printing passbook updates using a print wheel. It was designed to fit into the minimum amount of space and could have a 3604 placed on top of it. The Model 1 was announced 8 November 1974 and withdrawn 30 August 1976. Model 2 was announced 28 April 1975.

==== IBM 3612 Passbook and Document Printer ====
A table-top printer that has two separate print wheels, one for documents and one for passbooks. Passbook updates print at 12 characters per inch and support both horizontal-fold and vertical-fold passbooks with a print line of up to 100 characters. Models 1-3 were announced on 10 August 1973.

- Model 1 Prints on a passbook and on a cut form.
- Model 2 Prints on a passbook, on a cut form, and on a journal/audit roll.
- Model 3 Prints on passbook, on a cut form, and on continuous fanfold paper.

==== IBM 3616 Passbook and Document Printer ====
A dot matrix printer for printing on passbooks, journals and other forms and documents with a maximum speed of 120 cps. The one print head performed two functions, printing on both passbooks as well as a journal roll. This printer could not be shared. It was announced 27 October 1978 and withdrawn 5 February 1986.

==== IBM 3620 Passbook/Forms Printer ====
A fast matrix printer. There are three models B01, B02, and B03.

==== IBM 3621 Self-service Statement Printer ====
A fast matrix printer. There are three models B01, B02, and B03.

=== Administrative Line Printers ===
The 3600 line included administrative line printers intended for branch operations rather than teller operations.

==== IBM 3615 Administrative Terminal Printer ====
This printer is intended to allow administrative printing of reports in a bank branch. There are two models:

- Model 1: Prints at 60 cps (local or remote loop attached)
- Model 2: Prints at 120 cps (local loop attach only)

==== IBM 3618 Administrative Line Printer ====
The 3618 Administrative Line Printer was IBMs first printer that used a replaceable band for the type face. It is a medium-speed line printer for volume output. It prints onto continuous fanfold paper, printing 8-inch lines with 80 print positions, expandable to 13.2-inch lines with 132 positions using the Expanded Print Line special feature. Print speeds range from 80 LPM (with a 96-character set) to 155 LPM (with a 48-character set). The 64-character set band reduces nominal print speed to 120 lpm, while the 96 character set band reduces it to 80 lpm. An optional dual independent forms feed enables two different paper sizes to be handled simultaneously. It was announced on August 10, 1973.

==== IBM 3619 Administrative Terminal Printer ====
There are four models (A01 B01, B02 and B03). The 3619 is a high-speed matrix printer that IBM described as versatile.

=== Consumer Transaction Facilities ===
Two ATM devices were announced as part of the 3600 system.

==== IBM 3614 Consumer Transaction Facility ====
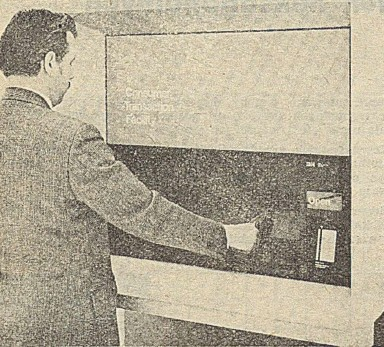
IBM 3614

The IBM 3614 Consumer Transaction Facility is an online banking terminal that provides customers with direct, self-service access to their accounts. Announced 10 August 1973 as IBM's second-generation banking machine and successor to the IBM 2984, the 3614 expanded beyond simple cash dispensing to support balance enquiries, deposits, payments, and other transactions configured by the financial institution. An optional deposit module enables bill payments alongside standard deposits, and an optional receipt printer provides customers with a printed record of each transaction.

The terminal can be loop connected to a 3601 located in a bank branch or can connect to a bank's central mainframe computer via telephone lines, which allowed financial institutions to deploy 3614s well beyond traditional branches — including supermarkets, department stores, and other high-traffic retail locations. This enabled banks to extend their reach beyond bank branches, while retail outlets benefited from customers having ready access to cash.

Four models of the 3614 are available:

IBM 3614 models
Model	Description	Denominations	Announced	Withdrawn
1	Indoor installation, for use during normal business hours	1	10 August 1973	9 March 1981
2	Exterior wall-mounted, accessible outside branch hours	1	10 August 1973	9 March 1981
11	Indoor installation (Dual Document Feed)	2	8 September 1975	9 March 1981
12	Exterior wall-mounted (Dual Document Feed)	2	8 September 1975	9 March 1981

Models 11 and 12 can dispense two denominations (such as $5 and $10 notes), although banks could also use this to store twice as many bills of the same denomination.

All 3614 models support the following optional features: transaction statement printer, depository unit, transaction chaining, transaction journaling, and check cashing. The last three are grouped under the designation Expanded Function Features.

A 40-character display guides customers through each step, prompts correction of any user errors, and returns account information. The unit also includes a card retention mechanism for flagging stolen cards, and can trigger an external alarm if tampering is detected. The through-the-wall models (2 and 12) use a protective window equipped with a safety clutch, which covers the access area (except the card slot). This opens when a card is inserted and closes 25 seconds after the last transaction is made.

Unusual by today's standards, the customer's ATM card was inserted with the magnetic stripe facing up as can be seen in the informational decal in the image of the IBM 2984. Modern ATMs typically expect customers to insert their card with the stripe facing down, which has the added benefit of displaying the card issuer's logo during insertion.

The 3614 was withdrawn from marketing on 9 March 1981.

===== Example customers =====
For many banks, the 3614 was the first ATM they placed into service. Example customers included:

- Lloyds Bank in the UK ordered 100 IBM 3614 to supplement their large fleet of 2984s.
- Fidelity National who created an offering called ABBy (Anytime Banking Benefits You) Card calling their IBM 3614s ABBY machines.
- Virginia National Bank notably installed an IBM 3614 in the main concourse of The Pentagon that they enclosed in an oak-panelled enclosure.
- In late 1975 through 1976, IBM placed a 3614 into the Smithsonian Institution Museum of History and Technology in Washington, where visitors could use a simulated bank card to get a copy of a pre-civil war dollar bill.

==== IBM 3624 Consumer Transaction Facility ====
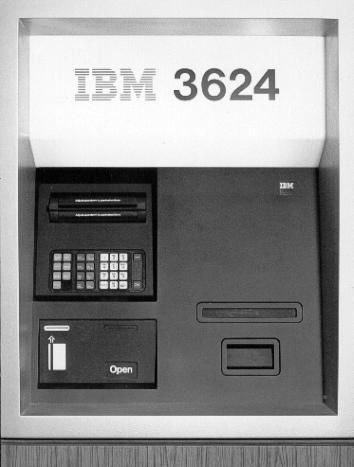
Ibm3624

The IBM 3624 was released in 1978 as a second-generation automatic teller machine (ATM) as a successor to the IBM 3614. Designed at the IBM Los Gatos lab, the IBM 3624 was manufactured at IBM facilities in Charlotte, North Carolina and Havant, England. The original product announcement of 14 March 1978 listed Raleigh as the plant of manufacture, with first customer shipments scheduled for February 1979.

The 3624 is a self-service terminal that issues variable amounts of currency, accepts deposits, and performs other financial transactions. It was designed for IBM 3614 family compatibility, allowing coexistence with existing 3614 installations on the same loop and simplifying the transition between the two products. It attaches to a 3601 or 3602 Finance Communication Controller via a loop interface, or modem attached to a virtual storage IBM S/370 or IBM 4300 processor through an IBM 3704 or IBM 3705 Communications Controller via SDLC.

At announcement the purchase prices were US$12,150 for Model 1, US$13,400 for Model 2, US$14,150 for Model 11, and US$15,400 for Model 12. There were four models:

IBM 3624 models
Model	Description	Denominations	Announced
1	Indoor installation, such as a building lobby	1	14 March 1978
2	Through-the-wall mounting for outdoor access	1	14 March 1978
11	Indoor installation, such as a building lobby	2	14 March 1978
12	Through-the-wall mounting for outdoor access	2	14 March 1978

The dual-feed models (11 and 12) can issue two different denominations in a single transaction, or load the same denomination in both dispensers to double the cash capacity. Documents other than currency, such as traveller's cheques, can also be dispensed. The machine issues up to 20 bills at a time in a single stack with no pre-packaging.

Key features include:

- Portable, interchangeable currency cartridges holding approximately 2,300 new bills or 1,700 used bills
- Cash issuing, account balance enquiry, account-to-account transfer, cheque cashing, deposits, and bill payments
- Programmable transaction keys with numeric or alphanumeric keypads
- Keyboard slanted 15 degrees from vertical for privacy; guidance display panel swivel-mounted for visibility and sunshielding
- Walk-up and drive-up configurations on Models 2 and 12
- Multiple language display based on identifier code on the customer's card
- Transaction chaining — multiple transactions with a single card insertion
- Customisable backlighted logo panel extending across the full width of the front

An optional transaction statement printer produces receipts on 96-column card stock measuring 2-5/8 × 3 1/4 inches (67 × 83 mm), and can also retain copies within a journal stacker for audit purposes. When making deposits, customers place a transaction record inside a deposit envelope; the optional depository printer stamps a sequence number on each envelope as it passes through the depository throat.

Models 2 and 12, when installed with the heavy-duty enclosure and through-the-wall accessories, meet the specifications of UL 291 and comply with the intent of U.S. Federal Regulation P for unattended operation when the branch is closed. The lobby models (1 and 11) meet the specifications of UL 114 and comply with the intent of Regulation P for attended use during business hours, on the condition that the machine is empty of currency at all other times.

The IBM 3612, 3624 and 3600 communications protocols were incompatible with other ATM vendors' high-level communications protocols.

One of the most lasting features introduced with the 3624 was the IBM 3624 PIN block format used in transmission of an encrypted personal identification number (PIN). The 3624 uses the U.S. Federal Information Processing Data Encryption Standard (DES) algorithm for encryption of sensitive data during communication line transmission. The encryption modules required for the 3600 Host Support program were designated BQKDES and BQKDPRS; source listings were not orderable and were not supplied with these modules.

== IBM 4700 Finance Communication System ==
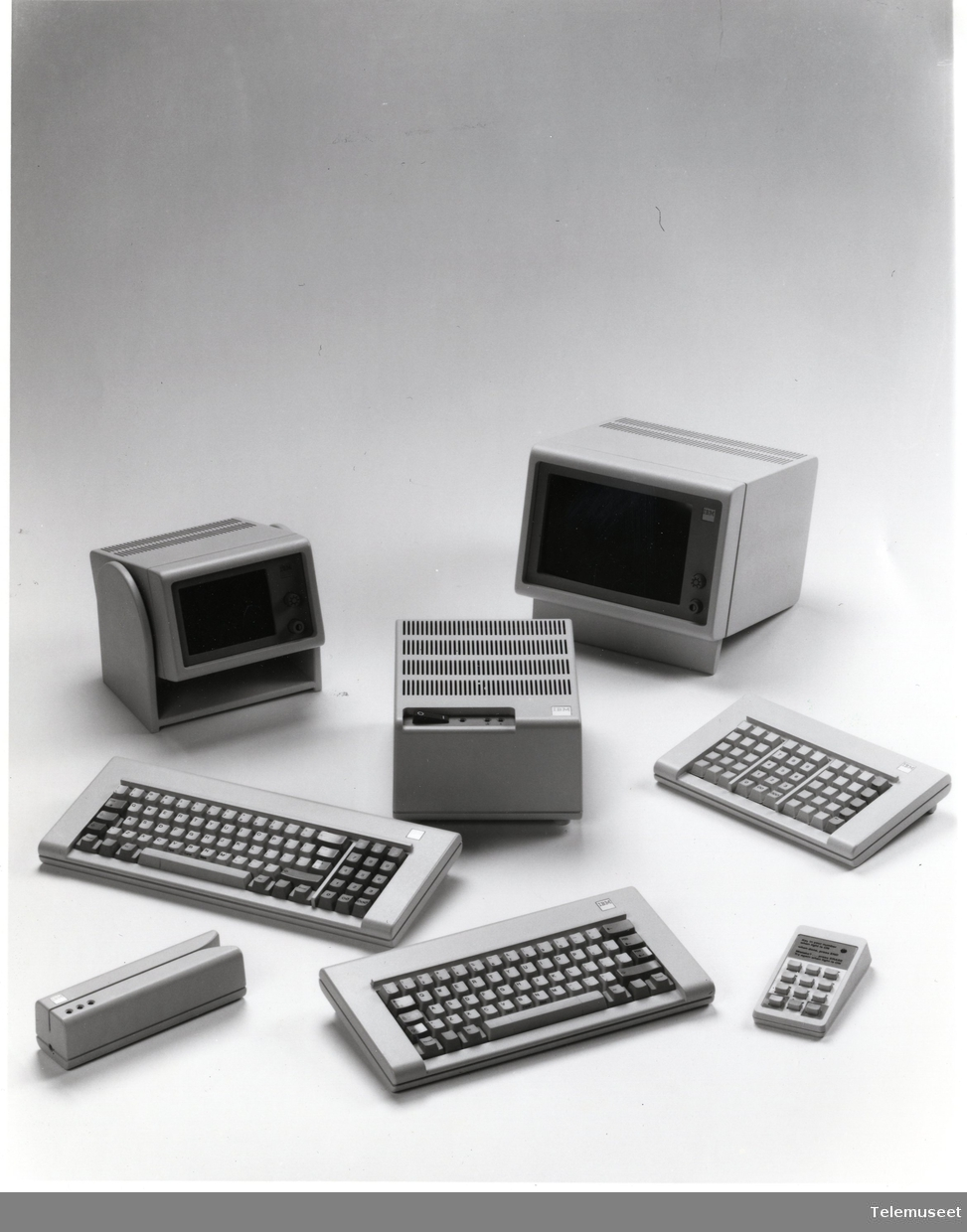
IBM 4700 Banking Equipment

The IBM 4700 Finance Communication System was announced on 14 September 1981 as the successor to the IBM 3600 Finance Communication System. Like the 3600, it centres on a programmable branch controller (the IBM 4701) which manages a family of teller and administrative terminal devices connected via a loop-based communications architecture. The 4701 communicates with a central IBM System/370, IBM 4300, IBM 8100, or IBM System/34 host processor — typically through an IBM 3704 or 3705 Communications Controller — using the Synchronous Data Link Control (SDLC) protocol at speeds up to 9,600 bit/s. Backward compatibility with the 3600 was a central design priority. Both systems can coexist on the same host communication link, and 3600 terminals, including the 3604 Keyboard Display, the 3610 and 3612 printers, and the 3624 Consumer Transaction Facility can attach directly to a 4701 controller loop alongside newer 47xx devices. With minor modification, 3600 application programs run unchanged on the 4701. The 4700 also introduced a distributed information system capability: a 4701 controller equipped with the optional fixed-disk storage feature can store and process branch-specific data such as account records, interest rate tables, ATM positive and negative account files independently of the host computer, reducing communication costs and shortening response times at remote branches. At time of announcement IBM declared manufacturing would be done in Charlotte USA, Greenock UK and Fujisawa Japan.

Products in the system included:

- IBM 4701: Branch Controller (8" floppy disc)
  - IBM 4702: Processor (5¼" HD floppy disc; hard disc)
- IBM 4704: Teller Terminal (Keyboard/Magnetic Swipe/Display/Optional PINpad)
- IBM 4710: Journal/Cutform Printer
- IBM 4712: Journal/Cutform Printer
- IBM 4713: Verification Printer
- IBM 4715: Printer
- IBM 4720: Cutform/Passbook Printer
- IBM 4722: Passbook Printer
- IBM 4723: Document Processor

=== IBM 4701 Finance Communication Controller and 4702 Processor ===
The IBM 4701 Finance Communication Controller is the programmable hub of the 4700 system. It is a compact, tabletop unit housing an operating system, customer application programs, and the configuration data that defines the attached work stations. The controller manages all loop-attached terminals and printers, runs application logic including arithmetic, data formatting, and host communication and can continue to capture and process transactions locally when the host link is unavailable.

The models included:

IBM 4700 Finance Communication Controller Models
Machine	Description	Model	Announced	Operating system	Storage media
4701	Finance Communication Controller	1	14 September 1981	8-in. diskette	8-in. diskette
4701	Finance Communication Controller	2	22 June 1982	8-in. diskette	8-in. diskette; 8-in. disk
4701	Finance Communication Controller	3	25 October 1984	8-in. diskette	8-in. diskette; 8-in. disk; 5.25-in. disk
4702	Processor	1	31 May 1985	5.25-in. diskette or 5.25-in. disk	5.25-in. diskette; 5.25-in. disk

Both 4701 models 1 and 2 include 192 KB of base controller storage (expandable in 64 KB increments to a maximum of 512 KB), an integrated diskette drive, hardware-based Data Encryption Standard (DES) encryption, and a host-computer attachment using SDLC. A software-based system monitor, loaded from diskette, controls operating functions and accepts commands from an attached 4704 display station, replacing the hardware control panels of earlier controllers.

=== IBM 4704 Display Station ===
The IBM 4704 Display Station is a terminal for bank tellers. All models use a cathode-ray tube (CRT) display with a detached, low-profile keyboard, and accept anti-glare filter panels in two colour options: green characters on a dark green ground, or yellow on brown. Each model can be fitted with a magnetic stripe unit and a personal identification number (PIN) keypad as optional accessories.

Models offered included:

- Model 1 — announced on 14 September 1981 it is a two-unit modular station suited to teller positions, with a separate display module and control module that can be positioned independently; available with either a 139.7 millimetres (5.50 in) diagonal screen showing 480 characters (12 rows of 40), or a 228.6 millimetres (9.00 in) diagonal screen switchable between 480 and 1,920 characters under program control; attaches to the 4701 via the standard terminal loop
- Model 2 — announced on 1 February 1983 it is a semi-modular station for administrative positions carrying a 228.6 millimetres (9.00 in) diagonal screen; incorporates an adapter for direct coaxial attachment to the 4701 rather than the loop
- Model 3 — announced on 3 May 1983 it is functionally identical to the Model 2 but fitted with a larger 304.8 millimetres (12.00 in) diagonal screen; intended for administrative positions where the greater screen area is of value

Four keyboard types are available:

- a 50-key Function keyboard with 45 assignable custom keys, suited to teller operation
- a 62-key Alphameric keyboard with a typewriter layout
- a 77-key Expanded Alphameric keyboard adding 15 custom keys to the right of the alphameric section
- a 107-key Administrative keyboard with 43 custom keys, supported on Models 2 and 3 only.

The magnetic stripe unit accepts documents between 0.25 and 0.85 millimetres (0.0098 and 0.0335 in) thick. The reader variant reads plastic cards recorded on Track 2 at 75 bpi to American National Standards Institute (ANSI) standard X4.16-1976; the reader/encoder variant additionally encodes passbooks and other documents at 210 bpi, compatible with 3604 magnetic stripe units.

The encrypting PIN keypad applies the US Data Encryption Standard (DES) algorithm before transmitting the PIN to the controller, retains its cryptographic key without power for several years, and erases it automatically if physically opened.

=== IBM 4710 Receipt/Validation Printer ===
The IBM 4710 Receipt/Validation Printer, announced on 14 September 1981, is a compact bidirectional wire-matrix printer for the teller work station. It prints on single-, double-, or triple-part cut forms including receipts, cheques, and validation documents and can maintain a simultaneous one- or two-part journal roll in a key-locked compartment. Using its 96-character set, the 4710 prints at up to 120 characters per second at 12 characters per inch (48 characters per line), or up to 100 characters per second at 10 characters per inch (40 characters per line). A bold, double-width printing mode is also available for highlighted fields, operating at half normal speed.

=== IBM 4720 Forms/Passbook Printer ===
The IBM 4720 Forms/Passbook Printer, announced on 1 February 1983, is a small desktop wire-matrix printer available in four models for use at both teller and administrative work stations.

The four models are:

- Model 1 — prints on cut forms only; directed toward the administrative work station
- Model 2 — prints on cut forms with a simultaneous journal roll; directed toward teller positions where passbook printing is not required
- Model 3 — prints on cut forms and on horizontal-fold or vertical-fold passbooks, without journal; offers more precise print registration on cut forms than Models 1 and 2
- Model 4 — prints on cut forms, passbooks, and journal roll; otherwise identical to the Model 3 in capability and print registration

=== IBM 4723 Document Processor ===
Announced by IBM in May 1982, the IBM 4723 Finance Communication Document Processor is a small desktop reader and inscriber that attached to IBM 3600 or IBM 4700 Banking controllers and is loop connected.

It was developed by the IBM Nordic Laboratory in Lidingoe Sweden and manufactured by IBM in Greenock, UK.

== IBM 473x Personal Banking Machines ==
On 6 December 1983, IBM announced a new family of ATMs designated the IBM 473x series, marketed as "Personal Banking Machines" (PBMs). Models included:

- IBM 4730 — Personal Banking Machine (1983)
- IBM 4731 — Personal Banking Machine (1983)
- IBM 4732 — Personal Banking Machine (1987)
- IBM 4736 — Personal Banking Machine (1985)
- IBM 4737 — Self-service transaction station

The 473x series of ATMs proved to be a commercial failure, partly because while the 4700 controllers could support the 3624, 473x machines could not be attached to existing 3600 controllers which remained in use at many bank branches. This meant that prospective 473x buyers would have needed to replace their 3600 controllers with 4700 controllers to adopt the new machines.

Competitors exploited this incompatibility. NCR Corporation built market share by equipping its contemporary ATMs with 3624 software emulation, offering banks a drop-in modernisation path for their existing 3600 systems without requiring a wholesale infrastructure change. Other ATM manufacturers pursued multi-protocol designs that could interoperate with multiple host systems.

=== IBM 4730 ===
The IBM 4730 Personal Banking Machine is a self-service financial terminal designed for deployment in bank lobbies, vestibules, supermarkets, and other retail or workplace locations. It attaches to the IBM 4701 Finance Communication Controller and supports SNA/SDLC LU0, BSC-3, and BSC-3 with 3276 emulation communications protocols. Connected to a System/370 host computer, the 4730 can accept cheque deposits without deposit slips, deliver cash against pay cheques, adjust account balances, and dispense exact change including coins. The coin-dispensing capability was later discontinued as the feature proved costly and saw little customer use.

Key features include:

- 480-character display on a 9-inch diagonal (23 cm) screen with selection keys
- Numeric keypad with function keys
- Magnetic stripe card reader
- Integrated statement printer
- Currency dispensing in up to five denominations plus four denominations of coin
- Cheque deposits without envelopes via built-in magnetic ink character recognition (MICR) reader
- Exact-amount cheque cashing
- Automatic multiple language support based on the customer's card

The 4730 is offered in twelve models across three tiers:

- Base models (F01, F02, R01, R02) — Track 2 card reader, statement printer capacity of 1,000 forms. Announced 6 December 1983
- Enhanced models (F11, F12, R11, R12) — Track 1/2/3 card reader with Track 3 read/write, statement printer capacity increased to 1,900 forms. Announced 27 November 1985
- Heavy-duty models (F51, F52, R51, R52) — certified to UL 291 for 24-hour unattended service, reinforced enclosures with key-and-combination locks, vandal-resistant gates, and enlarged cheque depository (approximately 600 items). Announced 27 November 1985

All models are available in single-console or dual-console configurations, with dual units sharing a common currency dispenser and logic module. The modular design supports free-standing or in-counter installation, with removable exterior panels that can be repainted or replaced to match branch décor.

=== IBM 4731 ===
The IBM 4731 Personal Banking Machine is a cash-dispensing terminal designed for through-the-wall, vestibule, and off-premises installations such as convenience stores, supermarkets, and railway stations. IBM emphasised the machine's compact physical design, with particular attention to ergonomics, privacy, and visual appearance for public-facing environments.

Key features include:

- Cash withdrawals, account balance enquiries, and funds transfers
- Support for additional bank-defined transactions
- One currency feed module as standard, expandable to a maximum of four
- SDLC and BSC-3 communications at 1,200 to 9,600 bit/s
- Local attachment to an IBM 4701 or IBM 4702 via SDLC, or remote attachment via modems

The 4731 is offered in two models:

- Model BH1 — included an IBM-supplied hardened enclosure rated to UL 291 safe standards, compliant with U.S. Federal Regulation P for unattended operation
- Model BO1 — omitted the enclosure, providing attachment points for installation into a customer-supplied safe

=== IBM 4732 ===
The IBM 4732 Personal Banking Machine is a through-the-wall and lobby terminal designed to handle both cash and non-cash banking transactions. Announced on 3 November 1987 with a purchase price of US$19,900 per unit, it was positioned as a direct physical and logical replacement for the IBM 3624 and certain other manufacturers' ATMs, fitting within existing wall openings and attaching to most established ATM networks. General availability was planned for the third quarter of 1988.

The customer-facing interface features a 9-inch diagonal (23 cm) positive-image CRT display with 480 characters arranged in 12 lines of 40, fitted with a limited-angle privacy filter restricting the viewing angle to 24 degrees either side of centre. Eight display selection keys flank the screen, and the standard consumer keyboard provides 16 keys in a 4 × 4 layout; an optional 32-key extended keyboard is available for institutions already using the same layout on the 3624, 4730, or 4736.

Key features include:

- Currency and coin dispensing in up to four denominations each
- Statement printing on pre-printed fan-fold forms (up to 5,000 sheets capacity)
- Cheque depository with magnetic ink character recognition (MICR) reader and approximately 600-cheque capacity
- Envelope depository
- DES encryption and decryption
- Multiple language support (up to four languages per machine), selectable by card identifier or customer choice
- Diskette-based journaling on a 3.5-inch 1.44 MB system diskette
- Optional video camera interface
- Dynamic reconfiguration upon component failure

The 4732 is offered in two models:

- Model 001 — standard-capacity document cartridges holding approximately 1,900 documents each
- Model 002 — expanded-capacity cartridges holding approximately 2,800 documents each; physically 120 millimetres (4.7 in) taller than the Model 001

Both models include a hardened enclosure rated to UL 291 for unattended operation, with a five-sided penetration alarm grid and contact pins for connection to an external security alarm system. Two document feed modules and one document reject bin are provided as standard, expandable to four feed modules. The standard-capacity cartridges and reject bins are interchangeable with those of the IBM 4736. Either model can be installed in a through-the-wall or free-standing configuration.

The 4732 attaches to the IBM 4701 or IBM 4702 via SNA/SDLC, BSC-3, or the 4700 B-Loop protocol. An optional IBM 3624 Emulator feature supports both Version 7 and Version 8 of the 3624 protocol, enabling existing host applications to run with minimal modification though attachment to an IBM 3600 system is not supported. A separate Alternate Connect feature allows the 4732 to attach to most SNA and bisync ATM networks at speeds up to 9,600 bit/s, including those using the Diebold 911 protocol and equivalents from Burroughs, Fujitsu, NCR, and Omron, enabling the machine to be substituted for a competitor's terminal without significant changes to the host application.

=== IBM 4736 ===
The IBM 4736 Personal Banking Machine is a compact self-service cash dispenser designed for bank lobby and vestibule use, as well as indoor off-premises locations such as airports, railway stations, department stores, and supermarkets. It is not designed for exterior installations where it would be exposed to weather. It can be installed free-standing, built into an interior wall, or set into a teller counter.

The 4736 was announced on 27 November 1985 with a purchase price of US$16,800 for the Model RH2 and US$14,300 for the Model RS2; general availability was planned for September 1986.

Key features include:

- Cash dispensing in up to two currency denominations, with electronically locked cartridges each holding approximately 2,050 new notes
- Account balance enquiries, funds transfers, and customisable bank-defined transactions
- 480-character CRT display with adjacent selection keys, fitted with a limited-angle privacy filter restricting the viewing angle to 24 degrees either side of centre
- Numeric keypad with function keys
- Variable-length receipt printer using roll paper, printing up to 48 characters per line at a minimum of 100 characters per second, with a capacity of approximately 2,500 receipts
- Magnetic stripe card reader — Track 1, 2, and 3 (with Track 3 read/write encoding)
- Japanese Universal Credit Card (JUCC) reader
- Local PIN validation within the terminal
- Support for major worldwide currencies and languages
- Dynamic reconfiguration upon component failure

The 4736 is offered in three models, each with two document feed modules as standard:

- Model RH2 — IBM-supplied hardened safe enclosure rated to UL 291 for unattended operation, with dual-custody access and optional alarm grids
- Model RS2 — IBM-supplied soft enclosure rated to UL 291 for attended operation
- Model R02 (not available in Canada) — shipped as sub-assemblies for installation into a customer-supplied OEM safe

The RH2 and RS2 models were available at announcement; the R02 appeared subsequently. All models are rear-serviced, with an optional turntable accessory allowing the machine to be rotated 180 degrees for front access. The terminal attaches to the IBM 4701 or IBM 4702 via SNA/SDLC, BSC-3, or the 4700 B-Loop protocol at speeds from 1,200 to 9,600 bit/s. IBM also published a statement of direction indicating its intention to provide a 3624 protocol emulator for the 4736, acknowledging the backward-compatibility concerns that hampered adoption of the 473x series.

=== IBM 4737 ===
The IBM 4737 Self-Service Transaction Station is a general-purpose consumer self-service terminal, distinct from the cash-dispensing ATMs in the rest of the 473x family. Rather than handling currency, it is designed to support a broad range of interactive applications beyond traditional banking — examples cited at announcement included car rental bookings, estate agent property listings, hotel reservations, account balance enquiries, standing order arrangements, and investment transactions.

Key features include:

- Touch-sensitive colour display screen
- Keyboard
- PIN pad
- An integrated IBM Personal System/2 Model 30

An application development toolkit was announced alongside the 4737, intended to help software developers produce new packages to run on the terminal. This toolkit approach reflected a shift from the fixed-function design of the earlier 473x ATMs toward a more flexible, software-defined platform aimed at the emerging self-service kiosk market.

== InterBold and the IBM 478x series ==
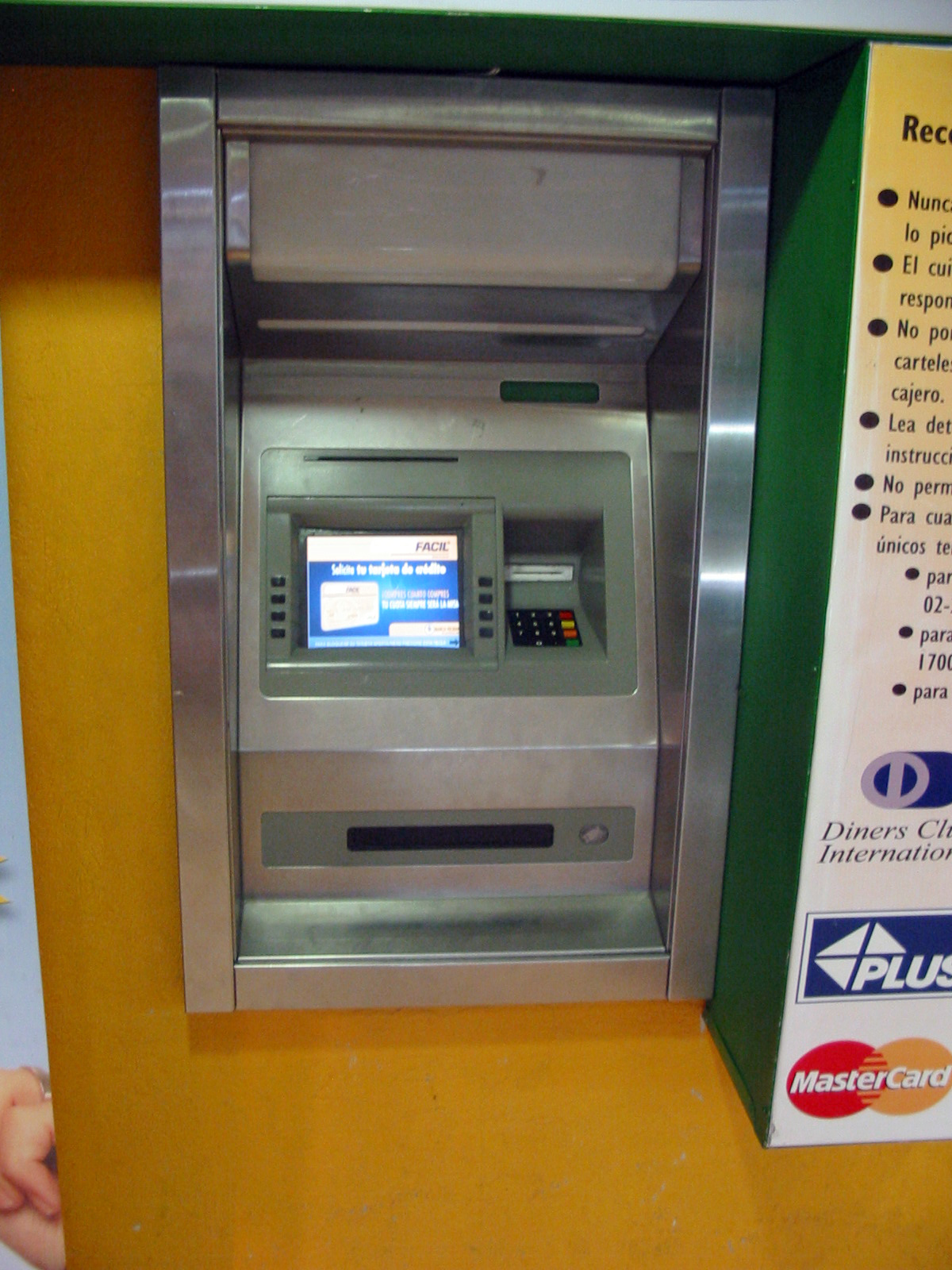
IBM 4789

After the failure of the 473x series, IBM effectively exited the proprietary ATM design business. In July 1990, IBM and Diebold, Incorporated announced a joint venture called InterBold, headquartered in North Canton, Ohio. Diebold held a 70 percent ownership stake and supplied the ATM hardware, while IBM contributed software development, systems integration capabilities, and its international marketing and distribution network.

Under the terms of the joint venture, Diebold marketed the combined ATM lines in the United States, while IBM marketed them internationally, particularly in Europe, Asia, and Latin America, where IBM had historically been the stronger brand. The ATMs sold by IBM under the InterBold arrangement were designated the IBM 478x series and were rebadged versions of the Diebold 10xx (Modular Delivery System) family. Not all Diebold 10xx models were offered under the IBM brand.

Known IBM 478x model-to-Diebold mappings included:

IBM model	Description	Diebold equivalent	Year
IBM 4781	Tabletop ATM	Diebold 1060	1991
IBM 4782	In-lobby ATM	Diebold 1062	1991
IBM 4783	Cash-only ATM	Diebold 1064	1991
IBM 4785	Exterior ATM	Diebold 1072	1991
IBM 4786	Exterior cash-only ATM	Diebold 1071	1991
IBM 4787	Exterior drive-up ATM	Diebold 1073	1991
IBM 4788	Exterior self-standing cash-only ATM	Diebold 1074	1991
IBM 4789	Cash-only ATM	Diebold 1063	1991

Within a year of the venture's formation, InterBold introduced the "i Series" ATM refresh in 1991, which was the first ATM model to use "image-lift" technology, allowing customers to see an image of deposited cheques on the ATM screen. The i Series machines were guaranteed to perform 99 percent of the time and included features such as stamp dispensing, account statement printing, and improved accessibility for disabled users. The 10xx/478x platform was further updated to the "ix Series" variant in 1994.

InterBold became commercially successful, and by September 1995 Diebold was manufacturing over half of all ATMs used in the United States. However, IBM grew dissatisfied with the returns from the venture, partly because developments in the broader computing market had undermined its strategy of linking ATMs to expensive mainframe systems. For its part, Diebold was dissatisfied with IBM's sales efforts, which often fell short of quota, as IBM salespeople treated the ATMs as just one product among many in their portfolio.

In July 1997, IBM exercised an option to sell its 30 percent minority ownership in InterBold to Diebold. After the two companies were unable to agree on a price, the matter was referred to a third party. The InterBold partnership was formally dissolved on 19 January 1998, when Diebold completed the purchase of IBM's share for $16.1 million.

The dissolution of InterBold marked the end of IBM's direct involvement in the ATM market. The Diebold 10xx platform, which had been sold under the IBM 478x designation, continued in production and was eventually replaced by the Diebold Opteva series of ATMs in 2003.

== Legacy ==
Although IBM's post-3624 ATM hardware was commercially unsuccessful in its own right, the company's influence persisted in the broader ATM industry. The IBM 3624 PIN block format remained an industry standard for PIN encryption long after the hardware was discontinued. Many later ATMs, including those produced through the InterBold partnership, ran OS/2, IBM's own operating system. The IBM 3624's communications protocols and design concepts were sufficiently influential that competitors, most notably NCR, built successful ATM product lines in part by duplicating or emulating aspects of the 3624 architecture.

== See also ==
- IBM document processors
- List of IBM products
- ATM
- Diebold Nixdorf
