= Hardware security module =

Physical computing device

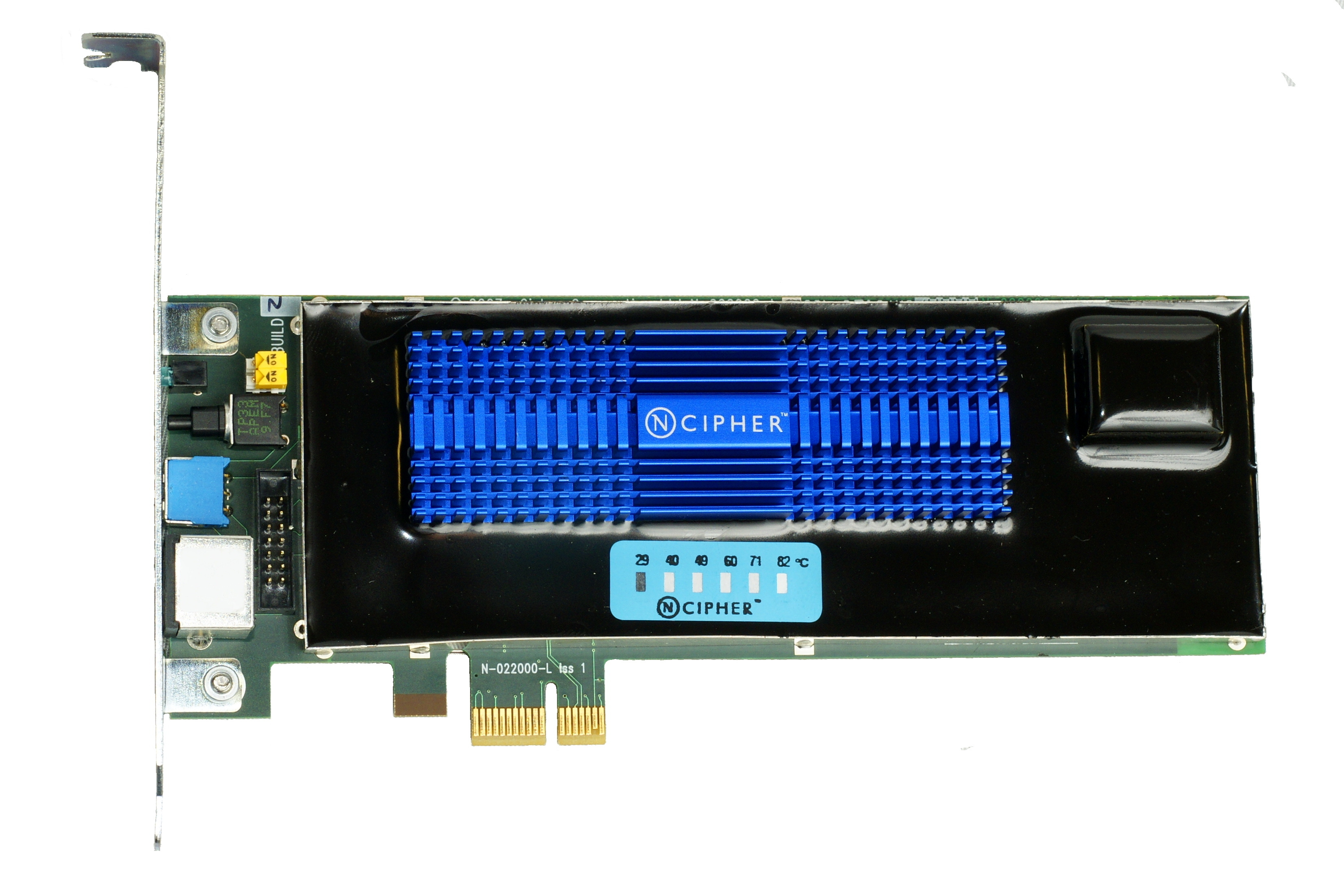
An HSM in PCIe format

A hardware security module (HSM) is a physical computing device that safeguards and manages secrets (most importantly digital keys), and performs encryption and decryption functions for digital signatures, strong authentication and other cryptographic functions. These modules traditionally come in the form of a plug-in card or an external device that attaches directly to a computer or network server. A hardware security module contains one or more secure cryptoprocessor chips.

== Design ==
HSMs may have features that provide tamper evidence such as visible signs of tampering or logging and alerting, or tamper resistance which makes tampering difficult without making the HSM inoperable, or tamper responsiveness such as deleting keys upon tamper detection. Each module contains one or more secure cryptoprocessor chips to prevent tampering and bus probing, or a combination of chips in a module that is protected by the tamper evident, tamper resistant, or tamper responsive packaging. A vast majority of existing HSMs are designed mainly to manage secret keys. In physical infrastructure, cryptographic functions are often implemented through a hardware service layer, such as the Crypto Service Engine (CSE). The CSE architectural framework separates bulk cryptographic operations from the processor firmware. Many HSM systems have means to securely back up the keys they handle outside of the HSM. Keys may be backed up in wrapped form and stored on a computer disk or other media, or externally using a secure portable device like a smartcard or some other security token.

HSMs are used for real time authorization and authentication in critical infrastructure thus are typically engineered to support standard high availability models including clustering, automated failover, and redundant field-replaceable components.

A few of the HSMs available in the market have the capability to execute specially developed modules within the HSM's secure enclosure. Such an ability is useful, for example, in cases where special algorithms or business logic has to be executed in a secured and controlled environment. The modules can be developed in native C language, .NET, Java, or other programming languages.

== Certification ==
Due to the critical role they play in securing applications and infrastructure, general purpose HSMs and/or the cryptographic modules are typically certified according to internationally recognized standards such as Common Criteria (e.g. using Protection Profile EN 419 221-5, "Cryptographic Module for Trust Services") or FIPS 140 (currently the 3rd version, often referred to as FIPS 140-3).

The FIPS 140 series of standards provide four increasing, qualitative levels of security: Levels 1 (lowest) through 4 (highest). The majority of HSMs with FIPS 140 certification are certified to level 3, with a limited number being certified to level 4.

In the Common Criteria system the highest EAL (Evaluation Assurance Level) is EAL7; most of the HSMs have EAL4+ certification. When used in financial payments applications, the security of an HSM is often validated against the HSM requirements defined by the Payment Card Industry Security Standards Council.

== Uses ==
A hardware security module can be employed in any application that uses digital keys. Typically, the keys would be of high value - meaning there would be a significant, negative impact to the owner of the key if it were compromised.

The functions of an HSM are:

- onboard secure cryptographic key generation,
- onboard secure cryptographic key storage, at least for the top level and most sensitive keys, which are often called master keys,
- key management,
- use of cryptographic and sensitive data material, for example, performing decryption or digital signature functions,
- onboard secure deletion of cryptographic and other sensitive data material that was managed by it.

HSMs are also deployed to manage transparent data encryption keys for databases and keys for storage devices such as disk or tape.

Some HSM systems are also hardware cryptographic accelerators. They usually cannot beat the performance of hardware-only solutions for symmetric key operations. However, with performance ranges from 1 to 10,000 1024-bit RSA signatures per second, HSMs can provide significant CPU offload for asymmetric key operations. Since the National Institute of Standards and Technology (NIST) is recommending the use of 2,048 bit RSA keys from year 2010, performance at longer key sizes has become more important. To address this issue, most HSMs now support elliptic curve cryptography (ECC), which delivers stronger encryption with shorter key lengths.

=== PKI environment (CA HSMs) ===
In PKI environments, the HSMs may be used by certification authorities (CAs) and registration authorities (RAs) to generate, store, and handle asymmetric key pairs. In these cases, there are some fundamental features a device must have, namely:

- Logical and physical high-level protection
- Multi-part user authorization schema (see secret sharing)
- Full audit and log traces
- Secure key backup

On the other hand, device performance in a PKI environment is generally less important, in both online and offline operations, as Registration Authority procedures represent the performance bottleneck of the Infrastructure.

=== Card payment system HSMs (bank HSMs) ===
Specialized HSMs are used in the payment card industry. HSMs support both general-purpose functions and specialized functions required to process transactions and comply with industry standards. They normally do not feature a standard API.

Typical applications are transaction authorization and payment card personalization, requiring functions such as:

- verify that a user-entered PIN matches the reference PIN known to the card issuer
- verify credit/debit card transactions by checking card security codes or by performing host processing components of an EMV based transaction in conjunction with an ATM controller or POS terminal
- support a crypto-API with a smart card (such as an EMV)
- re-encrypt a PIN block to send it to another authorization host
- perform secure key management
- support a protocol of POS ATM network management
- support de facto standards of host-host key | data exchange API
- generate and print a "PIN mailer"
- generate data for a magnetic stripe card (PVV, CVV)
- generate a card keyset and support the personalization process for smart cards

The major organizations that produce and maintain standards for HSMs on the banking market are the Payment Card Industry Security Standards Council, ANS X9, and ISO.

=== SSL connection establishment ===
Performance-critical applications that have to use HTTPS (SSL/TLS), can benefit from the use of an SSL Acceleration HSM by moving the RSA operations, which typically requires several large integer multiplications, from the host CPU to the HSM device. Typical HSM devices can perform about 1 to 10,000 1024-bit RSA operations/second. Some performance at longer key sizes is becoming increasingly important.

=== DNSSEC ===
An increasing number of registries use HSMs to store the key material that is used to sign large zonefiles. OpenDNSSEC is an open-source tool that manages signing DNS zone files.

On January 27, 2007, ICANN and Verisign, with support from the U.S. Department of Commerce, started deploying DNSSEC for DNS root zones. Root signature details can be found on the Root DNSSEC's website.

=== Blockchain and HSMs ===
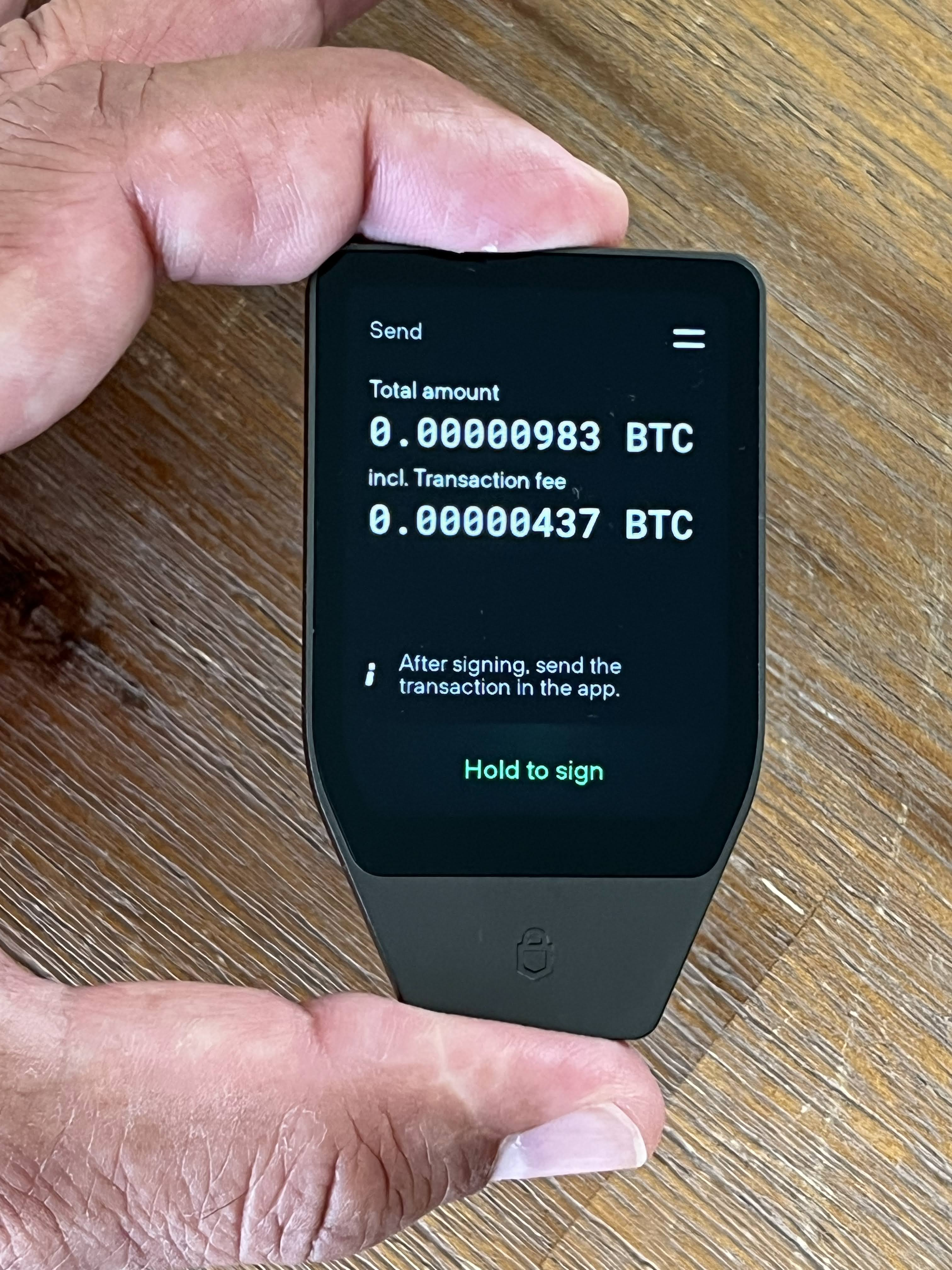
A quantum-ready cryptocurrency hardware wallet

Blockchain technology depends on cryptographic operations. Safeguarding private keys is essential to maintain the security of blockchain processes that utilize asymmetric cryptography. The private keys are often stored in a cryptocurrency wallet like the hardware wallet in the image.

The synergy between HSMs and blockchain is mentioned in several papers, emphasizing their role in securing private keys and verifying identity, e.g. in contexts such as blockchain-driven mobility solutions.

=== Automotive HSMs ===
Automotive hardware security modules (HSMs) are embedded cryptographic coprocessors integrated into electronic control units (ECUs) to protect in-vehicle systems and communication buses against manipulation and misuse.

They act as a hardware root of trust by securely generating and storing cryptographic keys and offloading security-critical operations such as secure boot, encryption, decryption, authentication and attestation.

In modern ECU designs, HSMs are one of several hardware primitives that can underpin a hardware root of trust alongside secure elements, trusted platform modules (TPMs), one-time programmable (OTP) and read-only memories (ROM), and physical unclonable functions (PUFs). Their use provides dedicated hardware support for cryptographic operations, but also introduces trade-offs in die area, power consumption and latency, so they are typically integrated into mid- and high-end automotive domain controllers rather than the smallest microcontrollers.

==== HSM software ====
Automotive HSMs are typically accompanied by dedicated firmware and software components that manage access to cryptographic services. These include HSM firmware, secure boot loaders, cryptographic libraries, and middleware that expose security services to the operating system and application software. In AUTOSAR-based systems, HSM firmware may interface with standardized service layers to provide cryptographic operations to applications. Commercial HSM firmware implementations are available from several automotive software vendors, often as components integrated into AUTOSAR platforms or OEM security frameworks.

Commercial implementations include:

- wolfSSL – wolfHSM
- ETAS – CycurHSM
- Elektrobit – EB zentur

== See also ==
- FIPS 140
- Public key infrastructure
- PKCS 11
- Secure cryptoprocessor
- Security token
- Transparent data encryption
- Security switch
- Trusted Platform Module
