= Missouri's 18th Senate district =

American legislative district

Missouri's 18th State Senate district
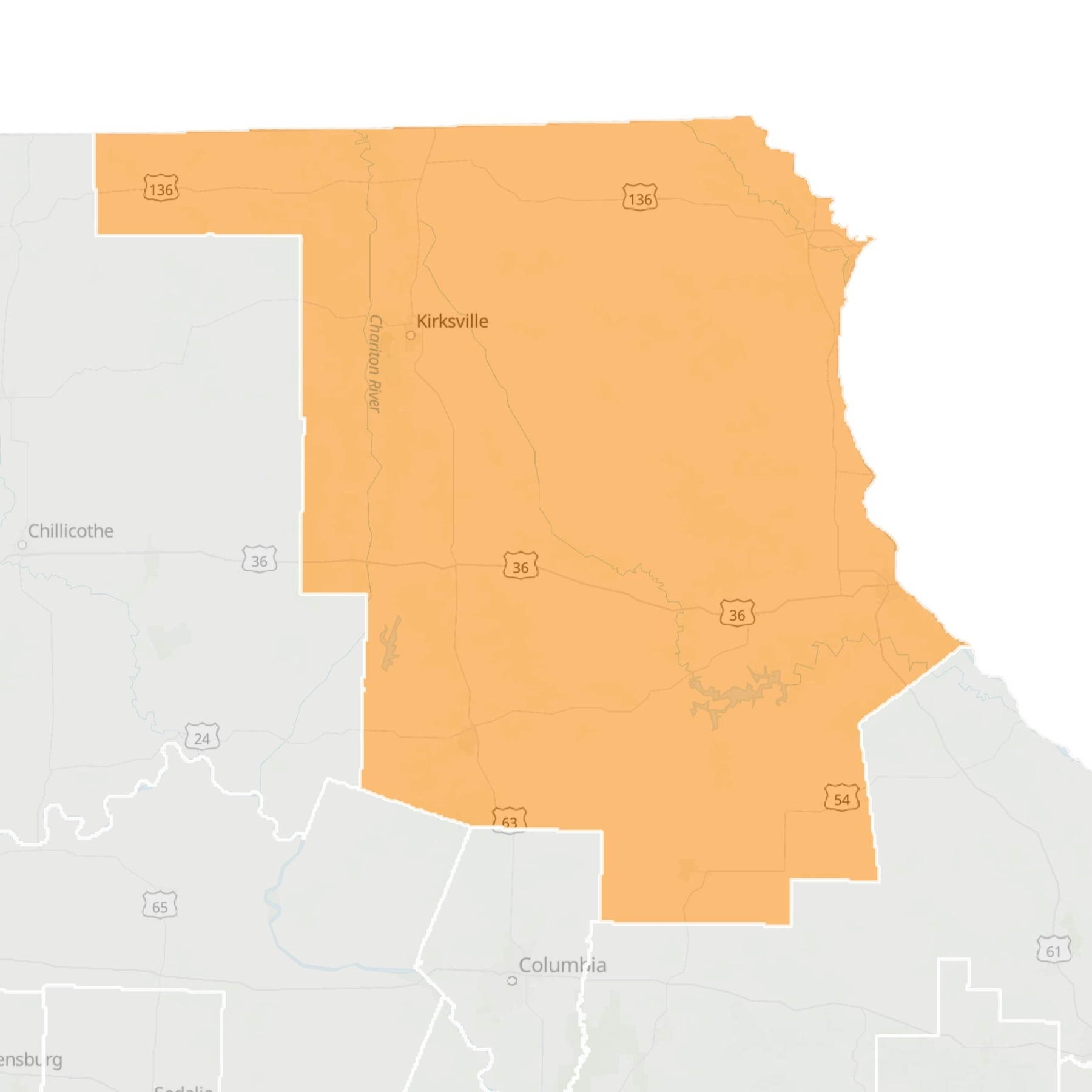
Senator
| Cindy O'Laughlin; R–Shelbina |
- Demographics: 90% White; 3% Black; 2% Hispanic; 1% Asian; 3% Multiracial
- Population (2023): 176,971

Missouri's 18th Senatorial District is one of 34 districts in the Missouri Senate. The district has been represented by Republican Cindy O'Laughlin since 2019, and she has served as president pro tempore since 2025.

== Geography ==
The district is based in rural northeastern Missouri and includes Adair, Audrain, Clark, Knox, Lewis, Macon, Marion, Monroe, Putnam, Ralls, Randolph, Schuyler, Scotland, and Shelby counties. Major municipalities in the district include Hannibal, Kirksville, Mexico, and Moberly. The district is also home to Truman State University, Mark Twain Lake, and several state parks, forests, and conservation areas.

== 2026 candidates ==
=== Democratic primary ===
- Nick Miller, Army combat veteran, business owner, working-class Missourian

=== Republican primary ===
- Dustin Blue, business owner and Army veteran
- Sarah Graff, Moberly councilmember and staff member for Congressman Sam Graves
- Ed Lewis, representative of Missouri House District 6
- Gregory Sharpe, representative of Missouri House District 4

== Election results (1998–2022) ==
=== 1998 ===
Missouri's 18th Senatorial District election (1998)
| Party | Candidate | Votes | % |
|---|---|---|---|
| Democratic | Joe Maxwell | 34,503 | 72.8 |
| Republican | James Lemon | 12,908 | 27.2 |
| Total votes | | 47,411 | 100.0 |

=== 2002 ===
Missouri's 18th Senatorial District election (2002)
| Party | Candidate | Votes | % |
|---|---|---|---|
| Republican | John W. Cauthorn | 29,853 | 55.5 |
| Democratic | Sam Berkowitz | 23,890 | 44.5 |
| Total votes | | 53,743 | 100.0 |
| Republican gain from Democratic | | | |

=== 2006 ===
Missouri's 18th Senatorial District election (2006)
| Party | Candidate | Votes | % |
|---|---|---|---|
| Democratic | Wes Shoemyer | 28,795 | 51.7 |
| Republican | Robert J. Behnen | 26,953 | 48.3 |
| Total votes | | 55,748 | 100.0 |
| Democratic gain from Republican | | | |

=== 2010 ===
Missouri's 18th Senatorial District election (2010)
| Party | Candidate | Votes | % |
|---|---|---|---|
| Republican | Brian Munzlinger | 30,532 | 58.3 |
| Democratic | Wes Shoemyer (incumbent) | 21,813 | 41.7 |
| Total votes | | 52,345 | 100.0 |
| Republican gain from Democratic | | | |

=== 2014 ===
Missouri's 18th Senatorial District election (2014)
| Party | Candidate | Votes | % |
|---|---|---|---|
| Republican | Brian Munzlinger (incumbent) | 39,460 | 100.0 |
| Total votes | | 39,460 | 100.0 |
| Republican hold | | | |

=== 2018 ===
Missouri's 18th Senatorial District election (2018)
| Party | Candidate | Votes | % |
|---|---|---|---|
| Republican | Cindy O'Laughlin | 46,263 | 70.3 |
| Democratic | Crystal Stephens | 19,555 | 29.7 |
| Total votes | | 65,818 | 100.0 |
| Republican hold | | | |

=== 2022 ===
Missouri's 18th Senatorial District election (2022)
| Party | Candidate | Votes | % |
|---|---|---|---|
| Republican | Cindy O'Laughlin (incumbent) | 42,989 | 75.8 |
| Democratic | Ayanna Shivers | 13,739 | 24.2 |
| Total votes | | 56,728 | 100.0 |
| Republican hold | | | |

== Statewide election results ==
| Year | Office | Results |
|---|---|---|
| 2008 | President | McCain 57.6 – 39.5% |
| 2012 | President | Romney 64.9 – 35.1% |
| 2016 | President | Trump 72.4 – 23.4% |
| 2016 | Senate | Blunt 61.6 – 33.8% |
| 2016 | Governor | Greitens 63.1 – 34.3% |
| 2018 | Senate | Hawley 67.0 – 29.1% |
| 2020 | President | Trump 74.6 – 23.8% |
| 2020 | Governor | Parson 75.2 – 23.0% |
