= Cindy O'Laughlin =

American politician

President pro tempore of the Missouri Senate
- Incumbent
- Assumed office January 8, 2025
- Preceded by: Caleb Rowden

Majority Leader of the Missouri Senate
- In office January 4, 2023 – January 8, 2025
- Preceded by: Caleb Rowden
- Succeeded by: Tony Luetkemeyer

Member of the Missouri Senate from the 18th district
- Incumbent
- Assumed office January 9, 2019
- Preceded by: Brian Munzlinger

Personal details
- Party: Republican
- Education: University of Missouri, Columbia (BBA)

Cindy O'Laughlin is an American politician. She was elected to Missouri's 18th Senatorial District in 2018, and as President Pro Tempore since 2025.

Prior to being elected to the Missouri Senate, O’Laughlin served as a member of the Shelby County R-IV School District and the Treasurer of the Missouri Club for Growth.

== Career ==
O’Laughlin served as vice president and co-owner of Leo O’Laughlin, Inc, a trucking company and ready-mix concrete business. She also worked as a school bus driver and administrator at a Christian school. She has participated in various civic organizations such as the Shelby County Chamber of Commerce & Industry, the Shelby County Economic Development Board, the Associated Builders and Contractors, and the Missouri Club for Growth.

In October 2017, O’Laughlin announced her candidacy for state senate. She won the Republican primary against three other candidates. She successfully ran against Democrat Crystal Stevens in the November election.

O’Laughlin serves as the chair of the Missouri Senate Committee on Education and also the Missouri General Assembly’s Joint Committee on Education.

=== Tenure ===
On July 6, 2021, O'Laughlin visited the Schuyler County Courthouse in Lancaster. The goal of the visit was to let residents talk about current Missouri issues. Topics brought up included gun rights, broadband and road infrastructure. Residents also talked about Medicaid, which had been approved by Missouri the previous month.

On joining the Senate, O'Laughlin was initially a member of the conservative caucus, but left in 2021 due to their disruptive tactics. In 2023, she was the first woman elected as majority leader of the Missouri Senate. In 2025, she was the first woman to serve as Missouri Senate president pro tem.

By the turn of the 2026 election cycle, O'Laughlin was ineligible to seek another term in office due to existing term limits on Missouri legislators. After announcing his candidacy for Senate, O'Laughlin endorsed three-term state Rep. Ed Lewis to succeed her during the 2026 Republican primary. This endorsement fell flat on Election Day, as Rep. Lewis was defeated by state Rep. Greg Sharpe, placing third overall.

==== Abortion ====
In 2025, O'Laughlin supported a measure to reverse a constitutional amendment passed by a majority of Missouri voters the previous year. As pro-tem, she facilitated the interruption of oppositional filibuster using an uncommon procedural move. O'Laughlin told media that the measure was a compromise for officials who campaign on opposing access to abortion.

==== Healthcare ====
O’Laughlin was an early opponent of state and national lockdowns as it related to the COVID-19 pandemic and advocated for the state to allow visitors to return to nursing homes. An editorial by The Kansas City Star called her advice “dangerous.”

In 2022, she opposed the Joe Biden administration's COVID-19 vaccine requirements for health care workers.

==== Education ====
O’Laughlin serves as the chair of the Missouri Senate Committee on Education and also the Missouri General Assembly’s Joint Committee on Education. She has sponsored legislation to expand charter schools and is a supporter of school choice. Prior to being elected to the Missouri Senate, O’Laughlin served as a member of the school board at her local public school and as an administrator at a local private school.

In 2020, O’Laughlin sponsored legislation to require transgender high school athletes to compete based on their assigned sex at birth.

==== Sick leave ====
O'Laughlin opposed sick leave provisions in a ballot measure passed by a majority of Missouri voters in 2024, calling required sick leave for employees an "economic bomb." The provision was upheld by Missouri Supreme Court.

== Personal life ==
O'Laughlin lives in Shelbina, Missouri. She has four sons, a foster daughter and seven grandchildren, and a passion for basset hounds.

== Electoral history ==
=== 2018 Primary ===
Republican Primary Results
Party	Candidate	Votes	%
Republican	Cindy O'Laughlin	9,893	36.70%
Republican	Craig Redmon	7,236	26.84%
Republican	Nate Walker	5,340	19.81%
Republican	Lindell F. Shumake	4,489	16.65%
Margin of victory		2,657	9.86%
Total votes		26,958	100.0%

=== 2018 General Election ===
Missouri's 18th State Senate District, 2018
Party	Candidate	Votes	%
Republican	Cindy O'Laughlin	46,225	70.30%
Democratic	Crystal Stephens	19,528	29.70%
Margin of victory		26,697	40.60%
Total votes		65,753	100.0%
Republican hold			

=== 2022 General Election ===
Missouri's 18th State Senate District, 2022
Party	Candidate	Votes	%	±%
Republican	Cindy O'Laughlin	42,989	75.78%	+5.48
Democratic	Ayanna Shivers	13,739	24.22%	−5.48
Total votes		56,728	100.0%	
Republican hold				

Missouri Senate
Preceded by Caleb Rowden	Majority Leader of the Missouri Senate; 2023–2025	Succeeded by Tony Luetkemeyer
Preceded by Caleb Rowden	President pro tempore of the Missouri Senate; 2025–present	Incumbent
