= Tony Luetkemeyer =

State senator for the 34th Senatorial District of the Missouri Senate

Majority Leader of the Missouri Senate
- Incumbent
- Assumed office January 8, 2025
- Preceded by: Cindy O'Laughlin

Member of the Missouri Senate from the 34th district
- Incumbent
- Assumed office January 9, 2019
- Preceded by: Robert Schaaf

Personal details
- Born: September 21, 1983 (age 42)
- Party: Republican
- Relations: Blaine Luetkemeyer (cousin)
- Education: University of Missouri (BA, JD)
- Website: Campaign website

Tony Luetkemeyer is an attorney and the state senator for the 34th Senatorial District of the Missouri Senate, representing Buchanan and Platte counties in northwest Missouri. He serves as the Majority Floor Leader and is a member of the Republican Party.

== Personal life ==
Luetkemeyer grew up in southeast Missouri in Farmington. He attended college at the University of Missouri, where he graduated with Bachelor of Arts degrees in history and political science, magna cum laude. During college, he was elected president of the undergraduate student government. The summer after college, Luetkemeyer interned in Washington D.C. at the White House in the Domestic Policy Council during the administration of President George W. Bush.

Luetkemeyer attended law school at the University of Missouri, where he earned his Juris Doctor and was inducted into the Order of the Coif. While in law school, he was appointed by Missouri Governor Matt Blunt to serve as the student representative to the University of Missouri Board of Curators.

After law school, Luetkemeyer clerked for Judge Patricia Breckenridge on the Supreme Court of Missouri. He began his law practice as an attorney at Shook Hardy & Bacon in Kansas City.

Luetkemeyer lives in Parkville, Missouri and is married to Lucinda Luetkemeyer. He is a relative of Blaine Luetkemeyer, who served as a U.S. representative and state representative.

== Missouri Senate ==
=== Senate Leadership ===
In 2024, Luetkemeyer was elected by the Missouri Senate Republican Caucus to serve as the Majority Floor Leader. Prior to becoming Majority Leader, he served as the Majority Whip (101st General Assembly) and Majority Caucus Chairman (102nd General Assembly) of the Missouri Senate.

=== Committees ===
Luetkemeyer was sworn into the Missouri Senate on January 9, 2019, as a member of the 100th General Assembly. He served on the following committees:

- Judiciary and Civil and Criminal Jurisprudence, Chairman (2019–2024)
- Appropriations (2021–2024), Vice Chairman (2023-2024)
- Gubernatorial Appointments (2019–present), Vice Chairman (2025–present)
- Rules, Joint Rules, Resolutions and Ethics, (2019–present), Chairman (2025-present)
- Administration, Vice Chairman (2025–present)
- Government Accountability and Fiscal Oversight (2021–2022)
- Government Reform (2019-2020)
- General Laws (2019-2020)

=== Legislation ===
Senate Bill 678 & Senate Joint Resolution 38 - Kansas City Police Funding

At the start of the 2022 legislative session, Luetkemeyer filed Senate Bill 678 and companion Senate Joint Resolution 38 in response to attempts by Kansas City's mayor and city council to strip over $42M from the Kansas City Police Department's budget. A Missouri trial court later ruled the city's attempt unlawful. SB 678 increased the minimum funding required by the city for the KCPD from 20% to 25% of the city's general revenue. Governor Mike Parson signed SB 678 into law at KCPD Headquarters on June 27, 2022.

SJR 38 was placed on the 2022 November general election ballot as Amendment 4, which provided an exception in the Missouri Constitution to a prohibition on the legislature mandating increased funding for services by local government. On November 8, 2022, Amendment 4 passed overwhelmingly, with more than 63% of Missourians voting in favor. After the election, Kansas City Mayor Quinton Lucas filed suit in the Supreme Court of Missouri challenging the election results, based on the accuracy of the fiscal note drafted by State Auditor Nicole Galloway that accompanied the ballot question. Ultimately, the Supreme Court ordered a new election. In the August 2024 primary, Missouri voters again approved Amendment 4 by a margin of 51.2% to 48.8%. The measure passed by a wider margin in the Kansas City metropolitan area.

Senate Bill 600 - Violent Crime

During the 2020 legislative session, Luetkemeyer sponsored Senate Bill 600, an omnibus criminal law bill aimed at curbing the rise of violent crime in Missouri. The bill passed on a largely partisan vote in the House of Representatives on the last day of the 2020 session. The bill was introduced in the wake of Missouri's three largest cities—St. Louis, Kansas City and Springfield—being listed among the top 15 most dangerous cities in America, according to USA Today. Shortly after the USA Today report, Luetkemeyer wrote an opinion piece in the Kansas City Star, where he stated: "Without commonsense reforms to Missouri’s sentencing laws and criminal code, to give prosecutors and law enforcement more tools to fight violent crimes, our cities will continue to languish on the list of the country’s most dangerous." The major components of Senate Bill 600 included provisions:

• Limiting the ability of judges to grant probation to certain dangerous felons;

• Enhancing penalties for the offenses of armed criminal action and unlawful possession of a weapon;

• Modernizing the state's criminal conspiracy law;

• Creating the Missouri Criminal Street Gangs Prevention Act (similar to the federal RICO law); and

• Establishing the new felony offense of vehicle hijacking.

The bill was supported broadly by state and local law enforcement agencies and prosecutors. On February 20, 2020, Luetkemeyer was named Legislator of the Year by the Missouri Association of Prosecuting Attorneys for his efforts to "protect and defend the rights of crime victims, the profession of prosecution and the criminal justice system." The bill was signed into law on July 6, 2020.

Senate Bills 53 (2023) and 754 (2024) - Law Enforcement & Public Safety

These bipartisan bills included several key provisions relating to law enforcement and public safety.

- KCPD residency - The legislation relaxed the residency requirement for Kansas City Police Department officers, allowing them to live within 30 miles of the city limits. The bill was similar to one passed during a special legislative session, which allowed St. Louis police officers to live within one hour of the city. KCPD was one of the few remaining police departments in the state subject to a residency requirement. The bill increased officer recruitment at a time when the KCPD was down over 100 officers.
- Anti-Doxing - Doxing is a form of harassment where groups disclose private information about individuals to intimidate them. After incidents of harassment of several KCPD officers, SB 53 created a new felony crime for doxing law enforcement officers or their families.
- Inmate stimulus checks - Another provision required the Missouri Department of Corrections to seize federal COVID-19 relief checks received by inmates and use the money to pay restitution to the offenders’ victims.
- Sheriffs pay - The bill also included a pay raise for county sheriffs. Before SB 53, sheriffs’ salaries fell well below the salaries of their law enforcement peers, such as municipal police chiefs and state highway patrol captains, making recruitment and retention more difficult.
- Blair’s Law - Criminalizes celebratory gunfire for firing a gun recklessly into the air in a municipality. The bill was named in honor of Blair Shanahan-Lane, an 11-year-old girl from Kansas City who was killed by a stray bullet from celebratory gunfire on July 4, 2011.
- Max’s Law - Raises the penalties for harming law enforcement animals to a felony if the animal is seriously injured or killed. The bill was named for St. Joseph Police Department K9 officer Max, who was shot and killed in the line of duty in 2023.
- Valentine’s Law - Criminalizes fleeing a law enforcement traffic stop. People who flee a stop under circumstances that create a serious risk of injury or death can now face felony charges. The bill was named in honor of St. Louis County Police Department Detective Antonio Valentine, who was killed in the line of duty during a high-speed crash in pursuit of a fleeing vehicle.

Luetkemeyer’s extensive work on public safety policy earned him legislative awards from the Missouri State Troopers Association, Missouri Sheriffs’ Association, and Missouri Fraternal Order of Police. In 2024, the Missouri Chamber of Commerce and Industry awarded Luetkemeyer the Spirit of Enterprise Award for his work to make Missouri safer.

Senate Bills 190 and 676 - Tax Relief

During the 2023 legislative session, Luetkemeyer sponsored and passed Senate Bill 190 (later expanded and updated by SB 756), which authorized counties to freeze the property taxes on the primary residence of Missouri seniors age 62 or older. In addition, the legislation eliminated the state income tax on Social Security and pension benefits. The program's popularity in Greene County led to the county commission hiring additional staff to help process the thousands of applications from seniors applying for the property tax freeze.

In 2019, homeowners across Missouri saw large increases in their real property tax assessments, leading to a record number of assessment appeals. Many property owners received late notice of those increases, effectively depriving them of the ability to challenge the assessments. In response, Luetkemeyer filed Senate Bill 676. As finally passed, the legislation put in place several key protections for homeowners, including extending the time for homeowners to appeal assessments and requiring a physical inspection of properties when an assessment increases by 15% or more. In the event of a 15% or greater assessment increase, the bill also shifts the burden of proving the accuracy of the assessment from the taxpayer to the assessor.

The bill also included a provision exempting from state income tax the stimulus checks many Missourians received as a part of the Coronavirus Aid, Relief and Economic Security (CARES) Act. Due to the structure of the state's tax code, Missouri was one of only six states that could have taxed the stimulus checks. The measure enjoyed broad bipartisan support, passing the Senate (30-0) and the House of Representatives (147-4). The bill was signed into law on July 14, 2020.

Senate Joint Resolution 14 - Term Limits

During the First Regular Session of the 100th General Assembly, Luetkemeyer sponsored Senate Joint Resolution 14. The SJR passed the Missouri Senate 31-3 and the House of Representatives passed the measure on the last day of the 2019 legislative session. SJR 14 proposed amending the Missouri Constitution to impose term limits on all state elected officials. It was the only proposed amendment to the state constitution passed by the General Assembly during the 2019 legislative session. Since the 1990s, term limits of eight years applied to members of the legislature, governor and state treasurer. Other statewide officials, including the lieutenant governor, secretary of state, auditor, and attorney general, were exempt from term limits.

SJR 14 was placed on the Nov. 3, 2020 ballot as Amendment 1. It narrowly failed in a statewide vote, 48.026% (Yes) to 51.974% (No). Historically, term limits enjoyed broad support with Missouri's electorate, with term limits for governor passing by more than 72% in 1965, and legislative term limits passing by an even wider margin in 1992. Some believe Amendment 1 failed due to voter confusion, because another measure on the ballot—Amendment 3, which dealt with legislative ethics and redistricting—was opposed by millions of dollars on a "Vote No" campaign. No money was spent supporting Amendment 1.

Senate Bill 224 - Civil Discovery Rules

During his first year in office, Luetkemeyer sponsored Senate Bill 224, a measure that passed the Missouri legislature in the 2019 legislative session. SB 224 was modeled off several provisions of the Federal Rules of Civil Procedure relating to discovery, the process by which parties to a lawsuit gather evidence to support their case. The major features of SB 224 placed certain presumed limitations on discovery, including the scope of discovery, the number and length of depositions, the number of interrogatories and requests for production, and the discoverability of electronically stored information (ESI). SB 224 was championed by the business and tort reform communities as an efficiency measure to reduce the cost and length of litigation. Of the measure, Luetkemeyer stated: “These reforms will expedite lawsuits, ensure more timely resolution of disputes and reduce costs for all parties involved.” The bill was signed into law on July 10, 2019.

For his work on pro-business policies, Luetkemeyer was later recognized by the Missouri Chamber of Commerce and Industry as its 2019 Freshman Legislator of the Year.

== Electoral history ==
Luetkemeyer was elected to the Missouri Senate in the November 7, 2018 general election, after winning the August 7, 2018 primary. He was reelected to a second term on November 8, 2022, after running unopposed in the Republican primary.

Primary - 2018

In the primary, Luetkemeyer faced Republican challenger Harry Roberts, the then-Presiding County Commissioner of Buchanan County. In one of the most hotly contested state primaries of the 2018 cycle, Luetkemeyer won the Republican nomination with 53.7% of the vote to Roberts’ 46.3%.

Missouri's 34th State Senate District Republican Primary Election Results, 2018
Party	Candidate	Votes	%
Republican	Tony Luetkemeyer	11,679	53.67%
Republican	Harry Roberts	10,083	46.33%
Margin of victory		1,596	7.34%
Total votes		21,762	100.0%

General - 2018

In the November 7, 2018 general election, Luetkemeyer faced Democratic challenger Martin T. Rucker II, a former NFL player and All-American tight end for the Missouri Tigers. In what ended up being the most competitive state senate general election of the year, Luetkemeyer won the race with 52.5% of the vote, compared to Rucker’s 47.5%.

Missouri's 34th State Senate District General Election Results, 2018
Party	Candidate	Votes	%
Republican	Tony Luetkemeyer	38,648	52.47%
Democratic	Martin T. Rucker II	35,015	47.53%
Margin of victory		3,633	4.94%
Total votes		73,663	100.0%
Republican hold			

General - 2022

Luetkemeyer ran unopposed in the 2022 Republican primary for state senate. In the general election, Luetkemeyer faced Democratic opponent Sarah Shorter. Luetkemeyer was reelected by a more than 18% margin, 59.1% to 40.9%.

Missouri's 34th State Senate District General Election Results, 2022
Party	Candidate	Votes	%
Republican	Tony Luetkemeyer	37,236	59.1%
Democratic	Sarah Shorter	25,767	40.9%
Margin of victory		11,469	18.2%
Total votes		63,003	100.0%
Republican hold			

Missouri Senate
Preceded by Cindy O'Laughlin	Majority Leader of the Missouri Senate; 2025–present	Incumbent
