= McElvain (surname) =

McElvain is a surname. People with the surname include:

- Ethan McElvain, American baseball player
- Roth McElvain, American politician
- Samuel M. McElvain (1897–1973), American chemist

== See also ==
- Robert S. McElvaine, American historian
