= Missouri's 34th Senate district =

American legislative district

Missouri's 34th State Senate district
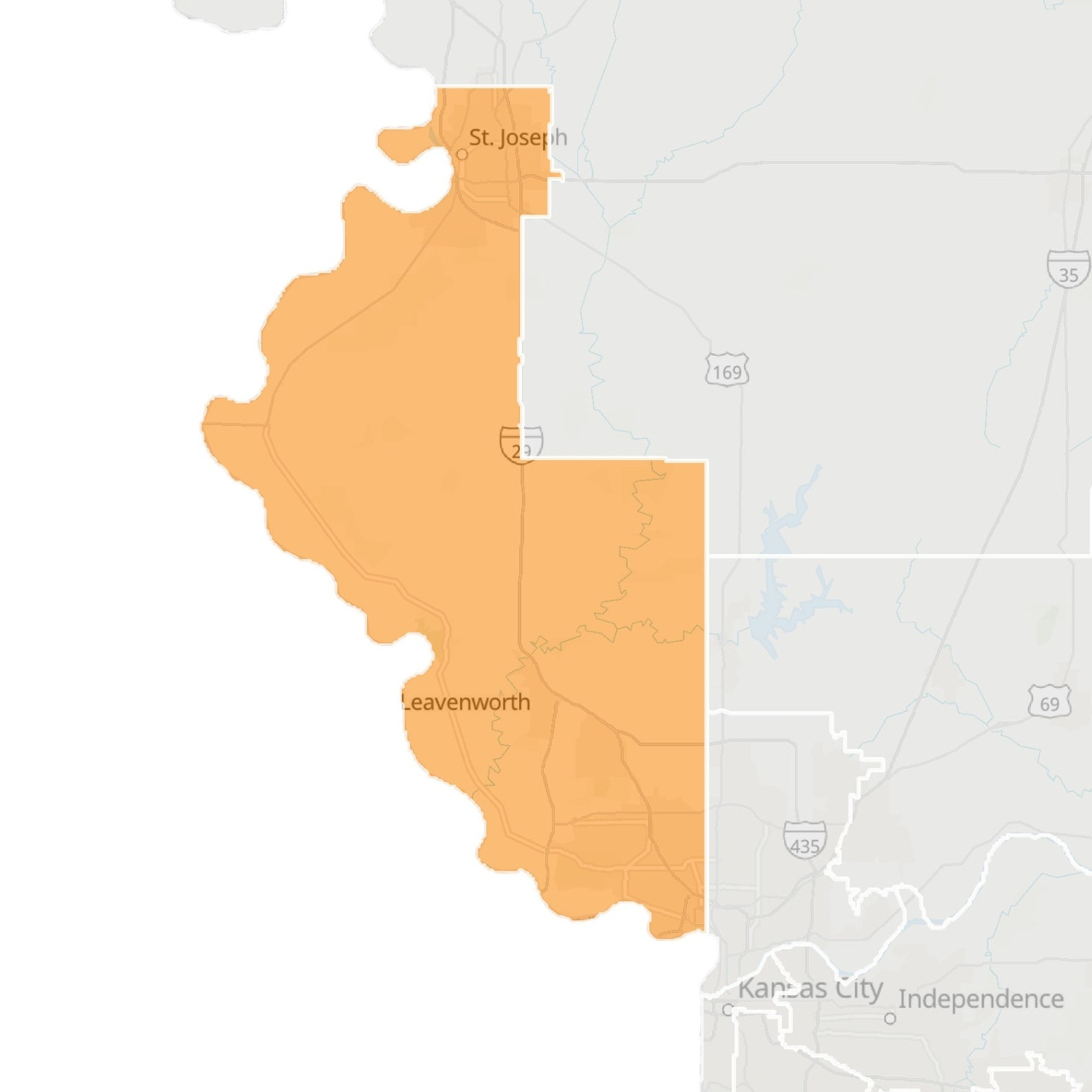
Senator
Tony Luetkemeyer; R–Parkville
- Demographics: 78% White; 7% Black; 7% Hispanic; 2% Asian; 1% Hawaiian/Pacific Islander; 5% Multiracial
- Population (2023): 186,951

Missouri's 34th Senatorial District is one of 34 districts in the Missouri Senate. The district has been represented by Republican Tony Luetkemeyer since 2019, and he has served as majority floor leader since 2025.

== Geography ==
The district is based in northwest Missouri and includes Platte and western Buchanan County. Major municipalities in the district include Parkville, St. Joseph, and a small northern portion of Kansas City. The district is also home to the Kansas City International Airport, Missouri Western State University, and Park University.

== 2026 candidates ==
=== Republican primary ===
- Sean Pouche, state representative of District 13
- Nathan Willett, Kansas City councilmember and teacher

=== Democratic primary ===
- Shereka Barnes, co-director of non-profit Kids Win Missouri
- Pam May, retired paralegal

== Election results (1998–2022) ==
=== 1998 ===
Missouri's 34th Senatorial District election (1998)
Party	Candidate	Votes	%
Democratic	Sidney Johnson	29,595	54.1
Republican	Eric Zahnd	25,080	45.9
Total votes		54,675	100.0

=== 2002 ===
Missouri's 34th Senatorial District election (2002)
Party	Candidate	Votes	%
Republican	Charlie Shields	27,334	51.7
Democratic	Glenda Kelley	22,855	43.3
Independent	Eric Pendell	2,544	5.0
Total votes		52,833	100.0
Republican hold			

=== 2006 ===
Missouri's 34th Senatorial District election (2006)
Party	Candidate	Votes	%
Republican	Charlie Shields (incumbent)	36,645	59.5
Democratic	David W. Mason	24,961	40.5
Total votes		61,606	100.0
Republican hold			

=== 2010 ===
Missouri's 34th Senatorial District election (2010)
Party	Candidate	Votes	%
Republican	Rob Schaaf	31,743	57.5
Democratic	Martin T. Rucker	23,483	42.5
Total votes		55,226	100.0
Republican hold			

=== 2014 ===
Missouri's 34th Senatorial District election (2014)
Party	Candidate	Votes	%
Republican	Rob Schaaf (incumbent)	24,139	56.1
Democratic	Robert Stuber	18,923	43.9
Total votes		43,062	100.0
Republican hold			

=== 2018 ===
Missouri's 34th Senatorial District election (2018)
Party	Candidate	Votes	%
Republican	Tony Luetkemeyer	38,654	52.5
Democratic	Martin T. Rucker II	35,026	47.5
Total votes		73,680	100.0
Republican hold			

=== 2022 ===
Missouri's 34th Senatorial District election (2022)
Party	Candidate	Votes	%
Republican	Tony Luetkemeyer (incumbent)	37,236	59.1
Democratic	Sarah Shorter	25,767	40.9
Total votes		63,003	100.0
Republican hold			

== Statewide election results ==
Year	Office	Results
2008	President	McCain 50.5 – 47.7%
2012	President	Romney 55.7 – 44.3%
2016	President	Trump 55.4 – 38.5%
2016	Senate	Blunt 47.6 – 47.5%
2016	Governor	Greitens 50.9 – 45.7%
2018	Senate	Hawley 49.9 – 46.5%
2020	President	Trump 54.0 – 44.0%
2020	Governor	Parson 54.7 – 42.9%
