= Schad =

Schad is a surname. Notable people with the surname include:

- Christian Schad (1894–1982), German painter
- Dominik Schad (born 1997), German footballer
- Isabelle Schad (born 1970), German dancer and choreographer
- James Louis Schad (1917–2002), American Catholic bishop
- Jerry Schad (1949–2011), American educator and nonfiction writer
- Jocinei Schad, known as Jocinei (born 1990), Brazilian football player
- Joe Schad (born 1974), American sports writer
- Joelle Schad (born 1973), Dominican tennis player
- Konstantin Schad (born 1987), German snowboarder
- Mike Schad (born 1963), Canadian football player
- Paul Schad-Rossa (1862–1916), German painter and sculptor
- Rodney Schad (born 1954), American politician from Missouri
- Tobias Schad (born 1991), German rower
- Wolfgang Schad (1935–2022), German evolutionary biologist

== See also ==
- Schad v. Arizona
