= Schadt =

Schadt : Ashkenazi Jews and German, Shaht : Malaysian, Syach : Indonesian is a surname. Notable people with the surname include:

- André Schadt, German swimmer
- Daniela Schadt (born 1960), German journalist and domestic partner of Joachim Gauck, President of Germany
- Eric Schadt (born 1965), American mathematician and computational biologist
- Martin Schadt (born 1938), Swiss physicist and inventor
- Fritz G. Schadt (1940-2001), Indonesian director and actor

== See also ==
- Schad
