= Craig Redmon =

American politician

Member of the Missouri House of Representatives from the 4th district
- In office January 2013 – January 2019
- Preceded by: Brian Munzlinger
- Succeeded by: Greg Sharpe

Personal details
- Born: January 29, 1959 (age 67) Kirksville, Missouri
- Party: Republican
- Spouse: Brenda Redmon
- Education: Culver-Stockton College
- Profession: Small business owner

Craig Redmon (born January 29, 1959) is a Republican former member of the Missouri House of Representatives. He represented the 4th District, which encompasses all of Clark, Knox, Lewis, Schuyler, and Scotland counties as well as the eastern half of Adair County east of U.S Highway 63, excluding the city of Kirksville. Most of this was previously the Missouri 1st District, also represented by Redmon, prior to Missouri House redistricting due to the 2010 U.S. Census.

== Personal history ==
Redmon was born in Kirksville, Missouri and is a 1977 graduate of Highland High School in Lewis County. Following graduation he attended Culver-Stockton College in Canton, Missouri, receiving a degree in business administration and economics in 1982. He is married to Brenda (Shouse) Redmon and they are the parents of twins Andrew and Audrey. When not involved with his legislative duties Redmon is owner/operator of a business in Monticello, Missouri. He is also involved in local youth athletics and officiated at basketball games.

== Political history ==
=== 2010 ===
Prior to running for the Missouri House, Craig Redmon served nine years on the Canton R-5 school board. Redmon defeated Neil McKee in the August, 2010 Republican Primary to advance to the General election in November. In the November election he defeated school teacher Keri Cottrell of Canton for the right to succeed Brian Munzlinger in the 1st District House seat.

=== 2012 ===
Redmon ran unopposed in the primary and general elections in 2012.

Missouri 1st District State Representative Election 2010
Party	Candidate	Votes	%	±%
Republican	Craig Redmon	7,458	58	Winner
Democratic	Keri Cottrell	5,367	42	

=== Legislative assignments ===
Craig Redmon served on the following committees:

- Appropriations – Chairman, Agriculture and Natural Resources sub-committee
- Budget
- Economic Development
- Emerging Issues in Agriculture
