= Blaine Luetkemeyer =

American politician (born 1952)

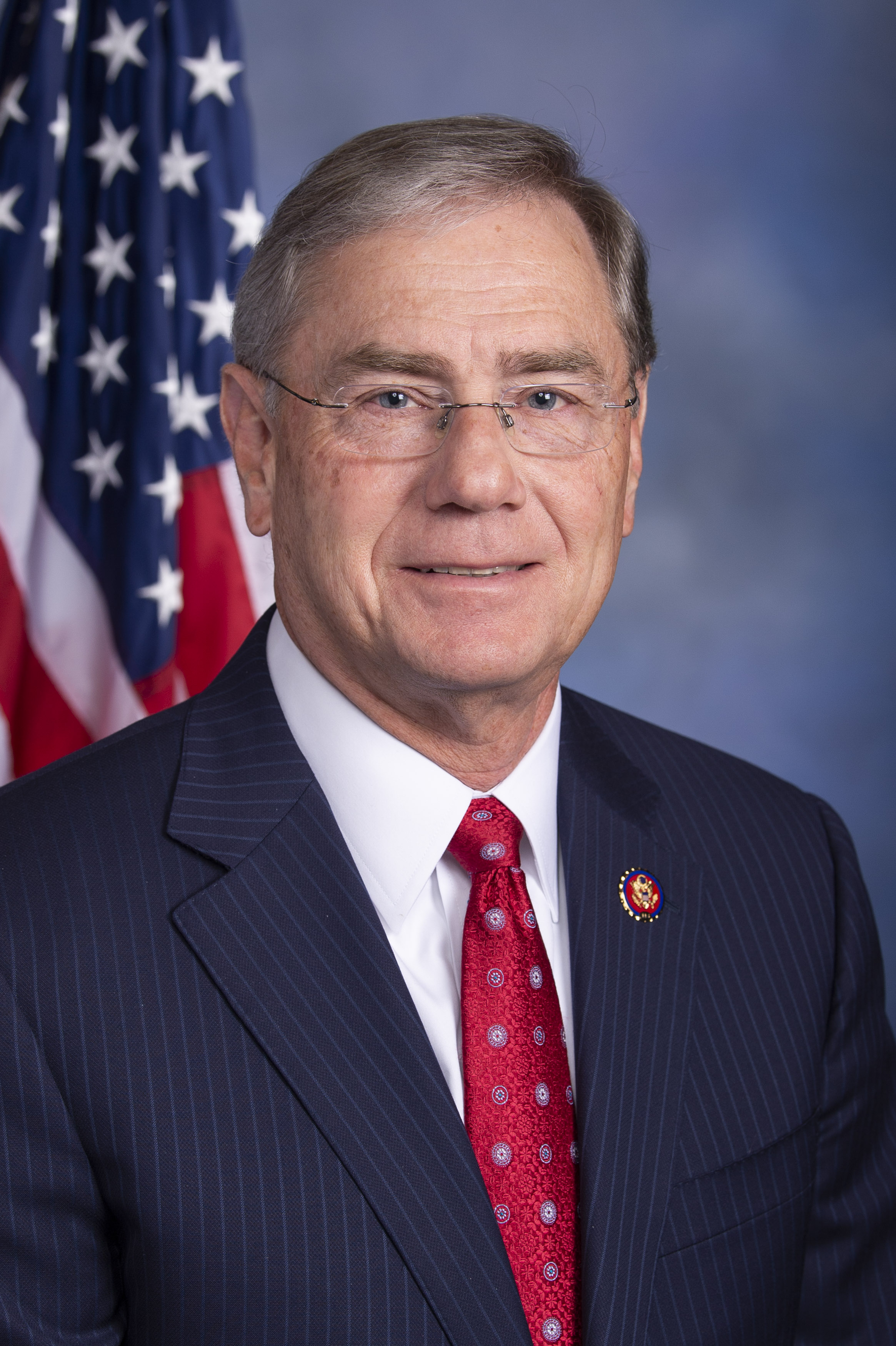
- Official portrait, 2019

Ranking Member of the House Small Business Committee
- In office January 3, 2021 – January 3, 2023
- Preceded by: Steve Chabot
- Succeeded by: Nydia Velázquez

Member of the U.S. House of Representatives from Missouri
- In office January 3, 2009 – January 3, 2025
- Preceded by: Kenny Hulshof
- Succeeded by: Bob Onder
- Constituency: 9th district (2009–2013); 3rd district (2013–2025)

Member of the Missouri House of Representatives from the 115th district
- In office January 6, 1999 – January 5, 2005
- Preceded by: Don Steen
- Succeeded by: Rodney Schad

Personal details
- Born: May 7, 1952 (age 74) Jefferson City, Missouri, U.S.
- Party: Republican
- Spouse: Jackie Luetkemeyer (m. 1976)
- Children: 3
- Relatives: Tony Luetkemeyer (cousin)
- Education: Lincoln University (BA)
- Luetkemeyer's voice Luetkemeyer supporting the 2017 Systemic Risk Designation Improvement Act. Recorded December 19, 2017

William Blaine Luetkemeyer (/ˈluːtkəmaɪ.ər/ LOOT-kə-my-ər; born May 7, 1952) is an American politician who served as the U.S. representative for Missouri's 3rd congressional district from 2013 to 2025. On January 4, 2024, he declined to run for reelection to Congress. He previously represented Missouri's 9th congressional district from 2009 to 2013. A member of the Republican Party, Luetkemeyer formerly served as a member of the Missouri House of Representatives.

== Early life and education ==
Luetkemeyer was born in Jefferson City on May 7, 1952. He attended Lincoln University and graduated with a Bachelor of Arts degree in political science with a minor in business administration.

== Career ==
A lifelong farmer, Luetkemeyer has also owned several small businesses, as well as running a bank and serving as an insurance agent. He also served on the board of trustees for the village of St. Elizabeth, near Osage Beach.

=== Missouri state politics ===
In 1998, Luetkemeyer was elected to the Missouri House of Representatives from the 115th Legislative District. As a state representative, Luetkemeyer chaired the Financial Services Committee and the House Republican Caucus and co-sponsored a statewide constitutional amendment defining marriage as being between a man and a woman, which was approved by 71% of Missouri voters in 2004. He also worked on legislation to allow Missourians to carry concealed firearms, ban partial-birth abortions, and reform worker compensation laws. He also supported deregulation of the financial industry—specifically the lending industry.

In 2004, Luetkemeyer did not seek reelection but instead was one of seven Republicans who ran for state treasurer. He finished second in the Republican primary, losing to Sarah Steelman, who won the general election.

In 2005, Governor Matt Blunt appointed Luetkemeyer Missouri Tourism Director, a post he held until he ran for the U.S. House of Representatives in 2008. One of his projects was working with Blunt and Lt. Governor Peter Kinder to start the Tour of Missouri, a cycling event modeled on the Tour de France.

== U.S. House of Representatives ==
Luetkemeyer's district, the 3rd, was numbered as the 9th from 2009 to 2013. It contains most of east-central Missouri, including Jefferson City and some of the southern and northern St. Louis suburbs and exurbs.

=== Elections ===
==== 2008 ====
Luetkemeyer became a candidate for the open seat in the 9th Congressional District after incumbent Kenny Hulshof’s resignation in his unsuccessful bid for governor. Luetkemeyer won the Republican primary with 39.7% of the vote against state representatives Bob Onder and Danie Moore, as well as Brock Olivo and Dan Bishir. Luetkemeyer narrowly won the general election over Democratic state representative Judy Baker. It was the only time since Hulshof unseated longtime Democratic incumbent Harold Volkmer that the Democrats managed even 40 percent of the vote...

==== 2010 ====
Luetkemeyer defeated Charles Baker in the Republican primary. He faced token third-party opposition as the Democratic Party did not field a candidate for the district's seat. In the general election he received 77% of the vote.

==== 2012 ====
Missouri was reduced to eight districts after the 2010 U.S. Census determined that the state's population growth was slower than the national average. Luetkemeyer's district was renumbered the 3rd Congressional District. It lost most of its northern portion to the newly drawn 6th Congressional District. To make up for the loss of population, it was pushed slightly to the west, gaining all of Jefferson City. Luetkemeyer already represented the share of the capital in Callaway County, but picked up Cole County in the redistricting process.

Luetkemeyer easily won the general election in his first run in the newly created district, with 63% of the vote.

==== 2014 ====
In the August primary, Luetkemeyer defeated two rivals with almost 80% of the vote. He won the general election with 68% of the vote.

=== Tenure ===
On October 23, 2013, Luetkemeyer introduced H.R. 3329; 113th Congress to enhance the ability of community financial institutions to foster economic growth and serve their communities, boost small businesses, and increase individual savings. The bill would direct the Federal Reserve to revise certain regulations related to small bank holding companies (BHCs). Existing regulations allow BHCs with assets of less than $500 million that satisfy other tests to incur higher amounts of debt than larger institutions in order to acquire other banks. H.R. 3329 would apply the less stringent standard to more BHCs by raising the asset limit to $1 billion and allow savings and loan holding companies to qualify.

On June 26, 2014, Luetkemeyer introduced H.R.4986, which would end the controversial Operation Choke Point, which was designed to limit the activities of money launderers but had come under criticism for alleged abuse. On November 20, 2014, in a further effort to end Operation Choke Point, he introduced additional legislation that would require federal banking agencies to put in writing any suggestion or order to terminate a customer's banking account.

In December 2020, Luetkemeyer was one of 126 Republican members of the House of Representatives to sign an amicus brief in support of Texas v. Pennsylvania, a lawsuit filed at the United States Supreme Court contesting the results of the 2020 presidential election, in which Joe Biden defeated incumbent Donald Trump. The Supreme Court declined to hear the case on the basis that Texas lacked standing under Article III of the Constitution to challenge the results of an election held by another state.

In October 2022, Politico reported that Luetkemeyer criticized some US-based financial executives attending the Global Financial Leaders' Investment Summit, saying that "American executives attending an event with the CCP's so-called enforcer makes a person question whether human rights are a real concern," in reference to Chief Executive John Lee.

=== Committee assignments ===
For the 118th Congress:

- Committee on Financial Services
  - Subcommittee on Financial Institutions and Monetary Policy
  - Subcommittee on Housing and Insurance
  - Subcommittee on National Security, Illicit Finance and International Financial Institutions (Chair)
- Committee on Small Business
  - Subcommittee on Economic Growth, Tax and Capital Access
  - Subcommittee on Rural Development, Energy, and Supply Chains
- Select Committee on Strategic Competition between the United States and the Chinese Communist Party

=== Caucus memberships ===
- Republican Study Committee
- Congressional Constitution Caucus
- Congressional Western Caucus
- Congressional Taiwan Caucus
- Congressional Coalition on Adoption
- Rare Disease Caucus

== Career after Congress ==
In February 2025, he was announced as the new chief executive of American Consumer & Investor Institute, a lobbying group that represents consumer voices on issues related to the regulation of financial technology firms and cryptocurrency. The group was started in 2023 by former U.S. Rep. Barbara Comstock, who had led the group until Luetkemeyer took over.

== Personal life ==
Luetkemeyer has been married to his wife Jackie since 1976. They have three children and six grandchildren. He is a member of the Knights of Columbus, the Eldon Chamber of Commerce, the Farm Bureau, and the National Rifle Association. He attends St. Lawrence Catholic Church. His cousin Tony is a state senator, and the state senate's majority leader as of 2025.

== Electoral history ==
2008 Election for U.S. Representative of Missouri's 9th Congressional District
Party	Candidate	Votes	%
Republican	Blaine Luetkemeyer	161,031	49.99
Democratic	Judy Baker	152,956	47.49
Libertarian	Tamara A. Millay	8,108	2.52
Total votes		322,095	100.00

2010 Election for U.S. Representative of Missouri's 9th Congressional District
Party	Candidate	Votes	%
Republican	Blaine Luetkemeyer (Incumbent)	162,724	77.36
Libertarian	Christopher W. Dwyer	46,817	22.26
Write-In	Clifford Jeffery Reed	748	0.36
Write-In	Ron Burrus	69	0.03
Total votes		210,358	100.00

2012 Election for U.S. Representative of Missouri's 3rd Congressional District
Party	Candidate	Votes	%
Republican	Blaine Luetkemeyer	214,843	63.49
Democratic	Eric C. Mayer	111,189	32.86
Libertarian	Steven Wilson	12,353	3.65
Total votes		338,385	100.00

2014 Election for U.S. Representative of Missouri's 3rd Congressional District
Party	Candidate	Votes	%
Republican	Blaine Luetkemeyer (Incumbent)	130,940	68.33
Democratic	Courtney Denton	52,021	27.15
Libertarian	Steven Hedrick	8,593	4.48
Write-In	Harold Davis	66	0.03
Total votes		191,620	100.00

2016 Election for U.S. Representative of Missouri's 3rd Congressional District
Party	Candidate	Votes	%
Republican	Blaine Luetkemeyer (Incumbent)	249,865	67.84
Democratic	Kevin Miller	102,891	27.93
Libertarian	Dan Hogan	11,962	3.25
Constitution	Doanita Simmons	3,605	0.98
Write-In	Harold Davis	10	0.00
Total votes		368,333	100.00

2018 Election for U.S. Representative of Missouri's 3rd Congressional District
Party	Candidate	Votes	%
Republican	Blaine Luetkemeyer (Incumbent)	211,243	65.08
Democratic	Katy Geppert	106,589	32.84
Libertarian	Donald Stolle	6,776	2.09
Total votes		324,608	100.00

2020 Election for U.S. Representative of Missouri's 3rd Congressional District
Party	Candidate	Votes	%
Republican	Blaine Luetkemeyer (Incumbent)	282,866	69.44
Democratic	Megan Rezabek	116,095	28.50
Libertarian	Leonard J. Steinman II	8,344	2.05
Write-In	Tom Clapp	43	0.01
Total votes		407,348	100.00

2022 Election for U.S. Representative of Missouri's 3rd Congressional District
Party	Candidate	Votes	%
Republican	Blaine Luetkemeyer (Incumbent)	180,746	65.11
Democratic	Bethany Mann	96,851	34.89
Total votes		277,597	100.00

== See also ==
- ATM Industry Association (ATMIA)
- Operation Choke Point

Missouri House of Representatives
Preceded by Don Steen	Member of the Missouri House of Representatives from the 115th district 1999–2005	Succeeded by Rodney Schad
U.S. House of Representatives
Preceded by Kenny Hulshof	Member of the U.S. House of Representatives from Missouri's 9th congressional district 2009–2013	Constituency abolished
Preceded by Russ Carnahan	Member of the U.S. House of Representatives from Missouri's 3rd congressional district 2013–2025	Succeeded by Bob Onder
Preceded by Steve Chabot	Ranking Member of the House Small Business Committee; 2021–2023	Succeeded by Nydia Velázquez
U.S. order of precedence (ceremonial)
Preceded by Jo Ann Emerson as Former U.S. Representative	Order of precedence of the United States as Former U.S. Representative	Succeeded by Ander Crenshaw as Former U.S. Representative
