= White label =

White label may refer to:

- White-label product, a permitted replication and rebranding of a product
- White label record, records with plain white labels attached.
- White Label Music, an independent record label based in the United Kingdom
- White Label, an album by Venetian Snares
- White Label Records, an imprint of Mushroom Records
- White-label ABMs, automatic banking machines not operated by a bank or credit union
