= Louis Riggs =

American politician

Member of the Missouri House of Representatives from the 5th district
- Incumbent
- Assumed office January 9, 2019
- Preceded by: Lindell Shumake
- Succeeded by: Roth McElvain (elect)

Personal details
- Born: 1960 or 1961 (age 65–66) Hannibal, Missouri, U.S.
- Party: Republican
- Spouse: Anne
- Children: 2
- Education: Westminster College, Missouri (BA); University of Missouri, Columbia (JD)

Louis W. Riggs (born c. 1961) is an American politician who is a Republican member of the Missouri House of Representatives. He has represented the 5th House District since 2019. He was a professor at Hannibal–LaGrange University.

== Electoral history ==
=== State representative ===
Missouri House of Representatives primary election, District 5, August 7, 2018
Party	Candidate	Votes	%	±%
Republican	Louis Riggs	3,069	50.88%	
Republican	Loren L. Graham	1,617	26.81%	
Republican	Neal R. Minor	1,024	16.98%	
Republican	John Paul Tomko	322	5.34%	

Missouri House of Representatives election, District 5, November 6, 2018
Party	Candidate	Votes	%	±%
Republican	Louis Riggs	10,186	71.88%	−2.61
Democratic	Joe Frese	3,984	28.12%	+2.61

Missouri House of Representatives election, District 5, November 3, 2020
Party	Candidate	Votes	%	±%
Republican	Louis Riggs	15,530	100.00%	+28.12

Missouri House of Representatives Election, November 8, 2022, District 5
Party	Candidate	Votes	%	±%
Republican	Louis Riggs	10,865	100.00%	0.00
