= Tim Remole =

American politician

Member of the Missouri House of Representatives from the 6th district
- In office January 7, 2013 – January 9, 2021
- Preceded by: Lindell Shumake
- Succeeded by: Ed Lewis

Personal details
- Born: October 2, 1957 (age 68) Danville, Illinois, U.S.
- Party: Republican
- Spouse: Brenda Remole
- Children: 2

Tim Remole (born October 2, 1957) is an American Republican politician. He is a former member of the Missouri House of Representatives from the 6th District, being first elected in 2012.
