= Rachel Bringer =

American politician

Rachel L. Bringer Shepherd

Member of the Missouri House of Representatives from the 6th district
- In office 2002–2011
- Preceded by: Randall H. Relford
- Succeeded by: Lindell Shumake

Personal details
- Born: September 19, 1971 (age 54) Palmyra, Missouri
- Party: Democratic Party
- Education: University of Missouri
- Occupation: Attorney, private practice Politician

Rachel L. Bringer Shepherd (nee Bringer) (born September 19, 1971) was a member of the Missouri House of Representatives. She had served since her election in 2002.

== Early life ==
Bringer was born September 19, 1971, and was raised on a farm in Marion County in the town of Palmyra, in northeast Missouri. A 1989 graduate of Palmyra High School, Rep. Bringer graduated summa cum laude with a bachelor of arts with honors in English from the University of Missouri in Columbia, Missouri in 1992. She received her juris doctor from the University of Missouri School of Lawin 1995, where she served as a member of the Missouri Law Review. She was married to Bobby Ray Shepherd of Hannibal in a small church wedding on July 21, 2012, at South Union Baptist Church in Maywood.

== Legislative duties ==
Rep. Bringer was a representative in the Missouri House of Representatives. She represented the 6th district consisting of Ralls and parts of Marion counties. She had the following committee assignments:

- Rural Community Development
- Budget
- Judiciary
- Special Standing Committee on Emerging Issues in Animal Agriculture
- Joint Committee on Legislative Research
- Joint Committee on Education
- Joint Legislative Committee on Court Automation

Rep. Bringer has introduced a number of bills during the 95th General Assembly. The following are the bills she has sponsored:

HB1323
Requires the certificate of title for a new outboard motor to contain both the year the motor was manufactured and the year the dealer received the motor from the manufacturer

HB1324
Prohibits members of the General Assembly from accepting any tangible or intangible item, service, or anything of value from a lobbyist

HB1325
Expands the No-call List to include all calls regardless of content and prohibits using automatic dialing announcing devices in certain situations

HB1326
Changes the laws regarding campaign contributions to candidates and committees

HB1894
Requires the Director of the Department of Mental Health, or his or her designee, to certify overdue patient accounts submitted to a court for collection

HB1895
Changes the definition of "security" as it relates to the regulation of securities so that the sale of variable annuities will be regulated by the Commission of Securities within the Secretary of State's Office

HB1896
Changes the process for registering securities in Missouri under the Missouri Securities Act

HB2037
Creates the crime of obstruction of justice

HJR91
Proposes a constitutional amendment changing the laws regarding campaign contributions to candidates and committees

^{95th General Assembly Legislation Sponsored}

== Professional life ==
Rep. Bringer is an attorney practicing in her hometown of Palmyra. She previously served as the assistant prosecutor in Marion County from 2000–2002 and was a law clerk for Judge Reinhard with the Missouri Court of Appeals, Eastern District from 1995-1997. Bringer, 39, was appointed presiding judge in the 10th Judicial Circuit in December, filling the position left vacant when Judge Robert Clayton II reached the mandatory retirement age of 70. At the time, Bringer was completing her eighth year in the Missouri House, representing the 6th District. Bringer had been practicing law for years and operated her own law office since 2000. She was an assistant prosecuting attorney in Marion County before her election to the Missouri House in 2002. Rachel Bringer Shepherd is a judge on the 10th Judicial Circuit Court in Missouri. She was appointed to the court in December 2010 by Governor Jay Nixon

== Community involvement ==
Rep. Bringer is a member of the South Union Baptist Church in Maywood, Rep. Bringer has taught Sunday school and is a pianist. She is also a former member of the Board of Trustees and Executive Committee of Hannibal-LaGrange College and the Boards of Directors of the American Red Cross, Palmyra Kiwanis, and the Palmyra Chamber of Commerce. She currently serves as a member of the Mark Twain Home Foundation Board. Additionally, she is also involved in the organization of Hannibal Democrat Days in the Accounting department.

== Honors ==
Rep. Bringer has been honored for her work in the legislature by the Missouri Judicial Conference, the NAACP—Hannibal branch, the Missouri Bar, the Missouri Farm Bureau, and the Missouri Association of School Administrators.

== Electoral history ==
^{2002, 2004, 2006, 2008 Election Results}

Missouri House of Representatives election, 2008
Party	Candidate	Votes	%	±%
Democratic	Rachel L. Bringer	14,614	100	
Republican	Unopposed			

Missouri House of Representatives election, 2006
Party	Candidate	Votes	%	±%
Democratic	Rachel L. Bringer	10,240	82.8	
Republican	Chris Koetters	2,123	17.2	−65.6

Missouri House of Representatives election, 2004
Party	Candidate	Votes	%	±%
Democratic	Rachel L. Bringer	12,935	100	
Republican	Unopposed			

Missouri House of Representatives election, 2002
Party	Candidate	Votes	%	±%
Democratic	Rachel L. Bringer	6,485	54.3	
Republican	Ross Walden	5,462	45.7	−8.6
