= Payday loans in the United States =

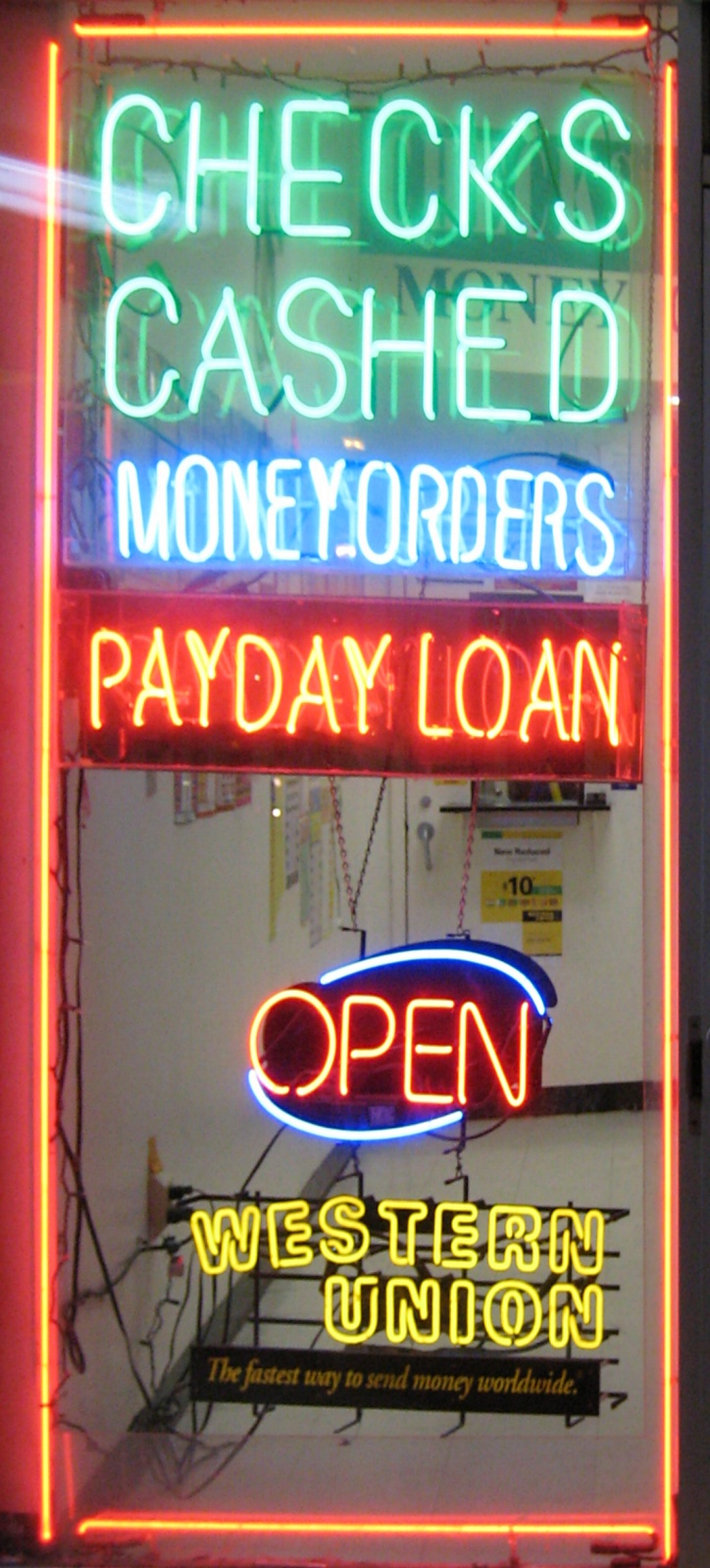
A shop window in Falls Church, Virginia advertises payday loans, 2007.

A payday loan (also called a payday advance, salary loan, payroll loan, small dollar loan, short term, or cash advance loan) is a small, short-term unsecured loan, "regardless of whether repayment of loans is linked to a borrower's payday." The loans are also sometimes referred to as "cash advances," though that term can also refer to cash provided against a prearranged line of credit such as a credit card. Payday advance loans rely on the consumer having previous payroll and employment records. Legislation regarding payday loans varies widely between different countries and, within the United States, between different states.

To prevent usury (unreasonable and excessive rates of interest), some jurisdictions limit the annual percentage rate (APR) that any lender, including payday lenders, can charge. Some jurisdictions outlaw payday lending entirely, and some have very few restrictions on payday lenders. In the United States, the rates of these loans were formerly restricted in most states by the Uniform Small Loan Laws (USLL), with 360%–400% APR generally the norm.

== Federal regulation ==
The federal government regulates payday loans because of: (a) significantly higher rates of bankruptcy amongst those who use loans (due to interest rates as high as 1000%); (b) unfair and illegal debt collection practices; and (c) loans with automatic rollovers which further increase debt owed to lenders.

The federal Truth in Lending Act of 1968 requires various disclosures, including all fees and payment terms.

The Dodd–Frank Wall Street Reform and Consumer Protection Act gave the Consumer Financial Protection Bureau (CFPB) specific authority to regulate all payday lenders, regardless of size. Also, the Military Lending Act imposes a 36% rate cap on tax refund loans and certain payday and auto title loans made to active duty armed forces members and their covered dependents, and prohibits certain terms in such loans.

The CFPB has issued several enforcement actions against payday lenders for reasons such as violating the prohibition on lending to military members and aggressive collection tactics.

In 2017, the CFPB issued a rule that payday, automobile title, and other lenders check to see if borrowers could afford to repay high-interest loans before issuing them. It revoked this rule in 2020, but retained other requirements.

Payday lenders have made effective use of the sovereign status of Native American reservations, often forming partnerships with members of a tribe to offer loans over the internet which evade state law. However, the Federal Trade Commission has begun to aggressively monitor these lenders as well. While some tribal lenders are operated by Native Americans, there is also evidence many are simply a creation of so-called "rent-a-tribe" schemes, where a non-Native company sets up operations on tribal land.

== State and district regulation ==
Payday lending is legal in 27 states, with 9 others allowing some form of short term storefront lending with restrictions. The remaining 14 and the District of Columbia forbid the practice. Some states have aggressively pursued lenders they felt violate their state laws.

Some states have laws limiting the number of loans a borrower can take at a single time according to LATimes report. This is currently being accomplished by single, statewide realtime databases. These systems are required in Florida, Michigan, Illinois, Indiana, North Dakota, New Mexico, Oklahoma, South Carolina, and Virginia States Statues. These systems require all licensed lenders to conduct a real time verification of the customer's eligibility to receive a loan before conducting a loan. Reports published by state regulators in these states indicate that this system enforces all of the provisions of the state's statutes. Some states also cap the number of loans per borrower per year (Virginia, Washington), or require that after a fixed number of loan renewals, the lender must offer a lower interest loan with a longer term, so that the borrower can eventually get out of the debt cycle by following some steps. Borrowers can circumvent these laws by taking loans from more than one lender if there is not an enforcement mechanism in place by the state. Some states allow that a consumer can have more than one loan outstanding (Oklahoma). Currently, the states with the most payday lenders per capita are Alabama, Mississippi, Louisiana, South Carolina and Oklahoma.

States which have prohibited payday lending have reported lower rates of bankruptcy, a smaller volume of complaints regarding collection tactics, and the development of new lending services from banks and credit unions.

=== Regulation in the District of Columbia ===
Effective January 9, 2008, the maximum interest rate that payday lenders may charge in the District of Columbia is 24 percent, which is the same maximum interest rate for banks and credit unions. Payday lenders also must have a license from the District government in order to operate.

=== Banning in Georgia ===
Georgia law prohibited payday lending for more than 100 years, but the state was not successful in shutting the industry down until the 2004 legislation made payday lending a felony, allowed for racketeering charges and permitted potentially costly class-action lawsuits. In 2013 this law was used to sue Western Sky, a tribal internet payday lender.

=== Regulation in New Mexico ===
New Mexico caps fees, restricts total loans by a consumer and prohibits immediate loan rollovers, in which a consumer takes out a new loan to pay off a previous loan, under a law that took effect November 1, 2007. A borrower who is unable to repay a loan is automatically offered a 130-day payment plan, with no fees or interest. Once a loan is repaid, under the new law, the borrower must wait 10 days before obtaining another payday loan. The law allows the term of a loan to run from 14 to 35 days, with the fees capped at $15.50 for each $100 borrowed 58-15-33 NMSA 1978. There is also a 50-cent administrative fee to cover costs of lenders verifying whether a borrower qualifies for the loan, such as determining whether the consumer is still paying off a previous loan. This is accomplished by verifying in real time against the approved lender compliance database administered by the New Mexico regulator. The statewide database does not allow a loan to be issued to a consumer by a licensed payday lender if the loan would result in a violation of state statute. A borrower's cumulative payday loans cannot exceed 25 percent of the individual's gross monthly income.

In 2017, the New Mexico Legislature banned payday loans.

=== Withdrawal from North Carolina ===
In 2006, the North Carolina Department of Justice announced the state had negotiated agreements with all the payday lenders operating in the state. The state contended that the practice of funding payday loans through banks chartered in other states illegally circumvents North Carolina law. Under the terms of the agreement, the last three lenders will stop making new loans, will collect only principal on existing loans and will pay $700,000 to non-profit organizations for relief.

=== Operation Sunset in Arizona ===
Arizona usury law prohibits lending institutions to charge greater than 36% annual interest on a loan. On July 1, 2010, a law exempting payday loan companies from the 36% cap expired. State Attorney General Terry Goddard initiated Operation Sunset, which aggressively pursues lenders who violate the lending cap. The expiration of the law caused many payday loan companies to shut down their Arizona operations, notably Advance America.

=== Regulation in Illinois ===
On March 23, 2021, Gov. J. B. Pritzker signed an interest cap of 36% on loans from payday lenders in Illinois.

== Proposed postal banking ==
Some countries offer basic banking services through their postal systems. The United States Post Office Department offered such a service in the past – the United States Postal Savings System. It was discontinued in 1967. In January 2014 the Office of the Inspector General of the United States Postal Service issued a white paper suggesting that the USPS could offer banking services, to include small dollar loans for under 30% APR. Both support and criticism quickly followed, however the major criticism isn't that the service would not help the consumer but that the payday lenders themselves would be forced out of business due to competition and the plan is nothing more than a scheme to support postal employees.

According to some sources the USPS Board of Governors could authorize these services under the same authority with which they offer money orders now.

== Industry growth ==
=== 19th century salary lenders ===
In the early 1900s some lenders participated in salary purchases. Salary purchases are where lenders buy a worker’s next salary for an amount less than the salary, days before the salary is paid out. These salary purchases were early payday loans structured to avoid state usury laws.

=== 20th century check cashing ===
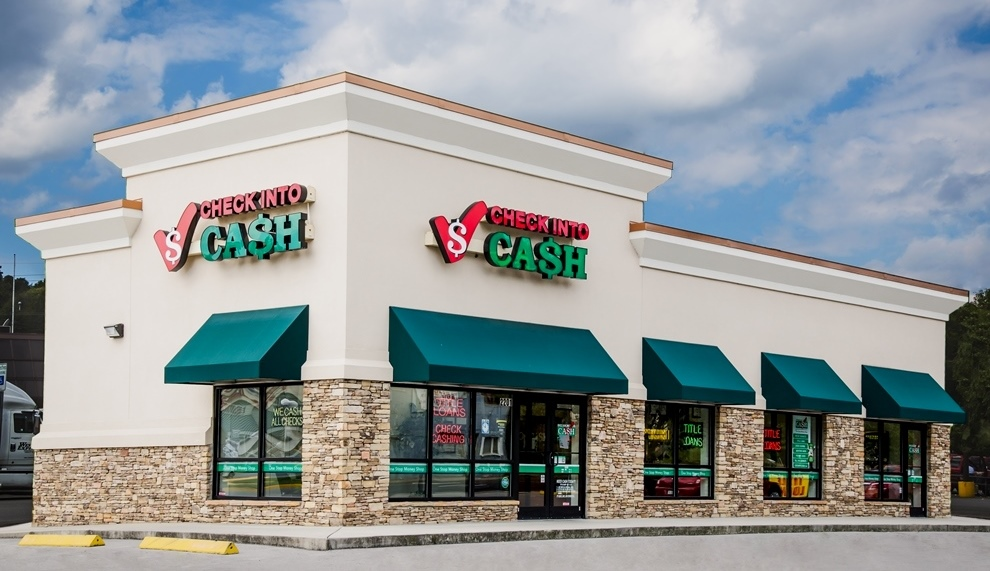
Check Into Cash store

As early as the 1930s check cashers cashed post-dated checks for a daily fee until the check was negotiated at a later date. In the early 1990s, check cashers began offering payday loans in states that were unregulated or had loose regulations. Many payday lenders of this time listed themselves in yellow pages as "Check Cashers."

=== 1990s to present ===
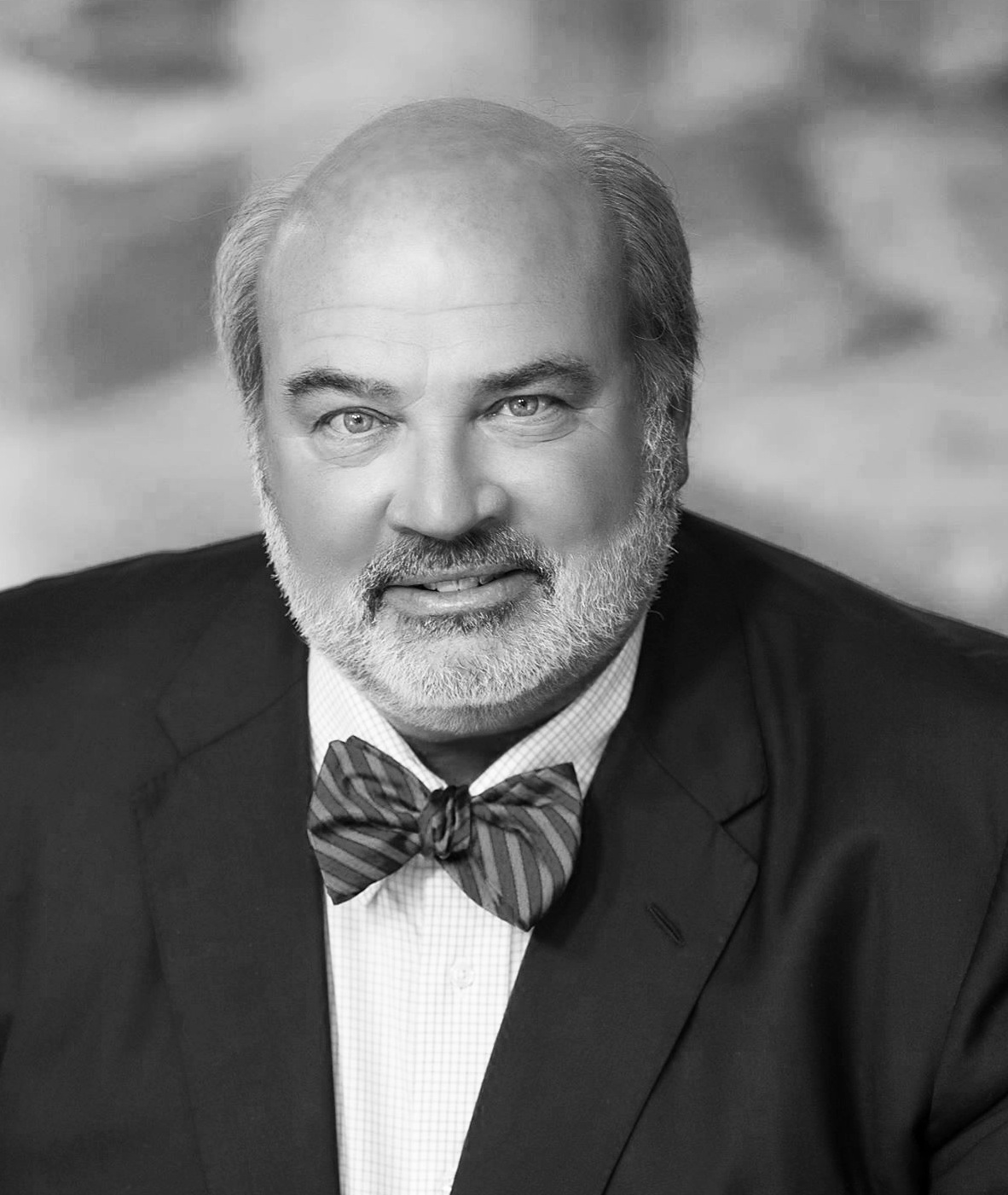
W. Allan Jones, known as "the father of payday loans"

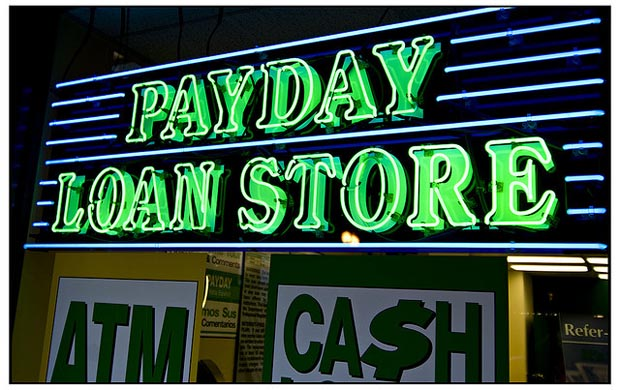
Payday loan storefront

Banking deregulation in the late 1980s caused small community banks to go out of business. This created a void in the supply of short-term microcredit, which was not supplied by large banks due to lack of profitability. The payday loan industry sprang up in order to fill this void and to supply microcredit to the working class at expensive rates.

In 1993, Check Into Cash was founded by businessman Allan Jones in Cleveland, Tennessee. This business model was made possible after Jones donated to the campaigns of legislators in multiple states, convincing them to legalize loans with such high interest rates.

Subsequently, the industry grew from fewer than 500 storefronts to over 22,000 and a total size of $46 billion. This number has risen even higher over the years. By 2008 payday loan stores nationwide outnumbered Starbucks shops and McDonald's fast food restaurants.

Deregulation also caused states to roll back usury caps, and lenders were able to restructure their loans to avoid these caps after federal laws were changed.

=== State and federal regulation on growth ===
The Consumer Financial Protection Bureau, in a June 2016 report on payday lending, found that loan volume decreased 13% in Texas after the January 2012 disclosure reforms. The reform required lenders to disclose "information on how the cost of the loan is impacted by whether (and how many times) it is renewed, typical patterns of repayment, and alternative forms of consumer credit that a consumer may want to consider, among other information". The report cites that the decrease is due to borrowers taking fewer loans rather than borrowing smaller amounts each time. Re-borrowing rates slightly declined by 2.1% in Texas after the disclosure law took effect. The Consumer Financial Protection Bureau has proposed rulemaking in June 2016, which would require payday lenders to verify the financial situation of their customers, provide borrowers with disclosure statements prior to each transaction, and limit the number of debt rollovers allowed, decreasing the industry by 55 percent. Another option would allow the lender to skip the ability to repay assessment for loans of $500 or less, but the lender would have to provide a realistic repayment schedule and limit the number of loans lent over the course of a year.

=== Debt rollover ===
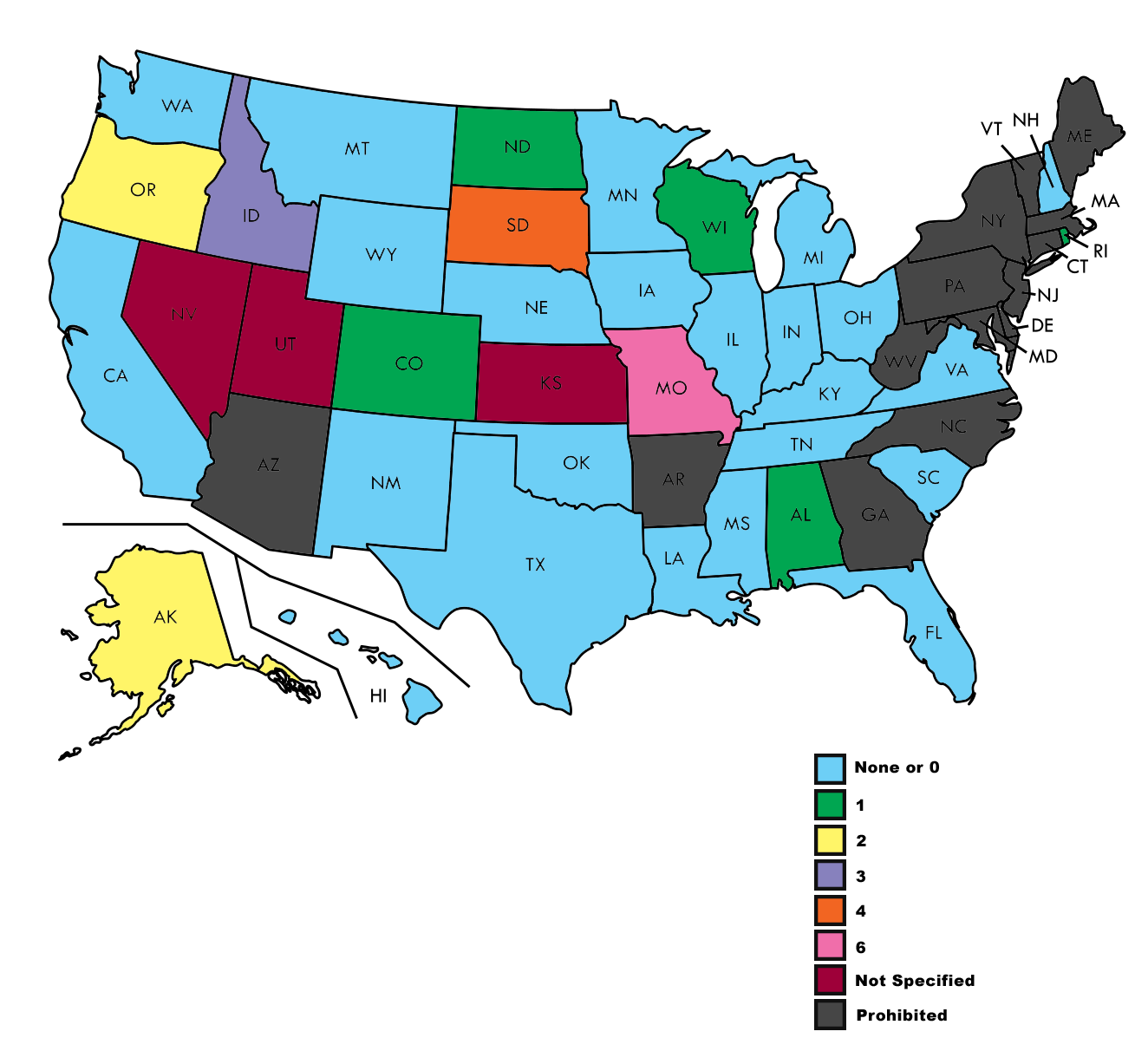
Payday loan rollovers allowed by state

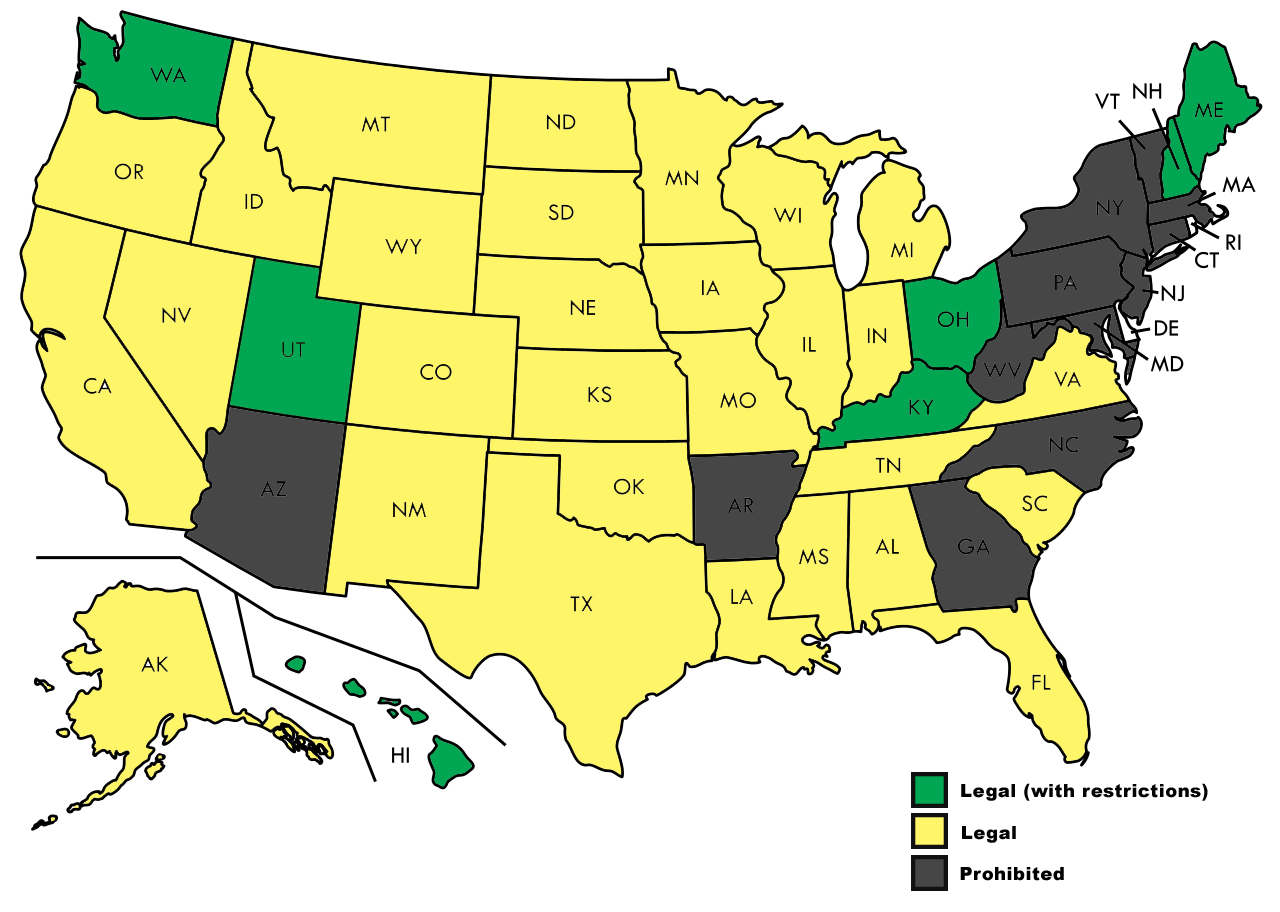
Legality of payday loans by state

Rolling over debt is a process in which the borrower extends the length of their debt into the next period, generally with a fee while still accruing interest. An empirical study published in The Journal of Consumer Affairs found that low income individuals who reside in states that permit three or more rollovers were more likely to utilize payday lenders and pawnshops for loans. The study also found that higher income individuals are more likely to use payday lenders in areas that permit rollovers. The article argues that payday loan rollovers lead low income individuals into a debt-cycle where they will need to borrow additional funds to pay the fees associated with the debt rollover. Of the states that allow payday lending, 22 states do not allow borrowers to rollover their debt and only three states allow unlimited rollovers. States that allow unlimited rollovers leave the number of rollovers allowed up to the individual businesses.

==== Payday lending legality and number of rollovers allowed ====
State	Payday lending legality	Number of rollovers allowed
Alabama	Legal	1
Alaska	Legal	2
Arizona	Prohibited	Prohibited
Arkansas	Prohibited	Prohibited
California	Legal	0
Colorado	Legal	1
Connecticut	Prohibited	Prohibited
Delaware	Legal	4
Florida	Legal	0
Georgia	Prohibited	Prohibited
Hawaii	Legal (applies to check cashers only)	0
Idaho	Legal	3
Illinois	Legal	0
Indiana	Legal	0
Iowa	Legal	0
Kansas	Legal	Not specified
Kentucky	Legal (applies to check cashers only)	0
Louisiana	Legal	0
Maine	Permitted for supervised lenders only	Prohibited
Maryland	Prohibited	Prohibited
Massachusetts	Prohibited	Prohibited
Michigan	Legal	0
Minnesota	Legal	0
Mississippi	Legal	0
Missouri	Legal	6 (borrower must reduce principal amount of loan by 5% or more upon each renewal)
Montana	Legal (at a low cost)	0
Nebraska	Legal	0
Nevada	Legal	Not specified (lenders cannot extend payment period beyond 60 days after expiration of initial loan period)
New Hampshire	Legal (at a low cost)	0
New Jersey	Prohibited	Prohibited
New Mexico	Legal	0
New York	Prohibited	Prohibited
North Carolina	Prohibited	Prohibited
North Dakota	Legal	1
Ohio	Legal (at a low cost)	0
Oklahoma	Legal	0
Oregon	Legal	2
Pennsylvania	Prohibited	Prohibited
Rhode Island	Legal	1
South Carolina	Legal	0
South Dakota	Legal	4
Tennessee	Legal	0
Texas	Legal	0
Utah	Legal (applies to check cashers only)	Not specified (cannot extend or renew loan more than 10 weeks from original loan date)
Vermont	Prohibited	Prohibited
Virginia	Legal	0
Washington	Legal (lender must have a small loan endorsement to their check casher license in order to make payday loans)	0
West Virginia	Prohibited	Prohibited
Wisconsin	Legal	1
Wyoming	Legal	0
Washington, DC	Legal	0

== Effects of regulation ==
In 2006, Congress passed a law capping the annualized rate at 36 percent that lenders could charge members of the military. Even with these regulations and efforts to completely ban the industry, lenders are still finding loopholes. The number of states in which payday lenders operate has fallen, from its peak in 2014 of 44 states to 36 in 2016.

== Competition and alternatives ==
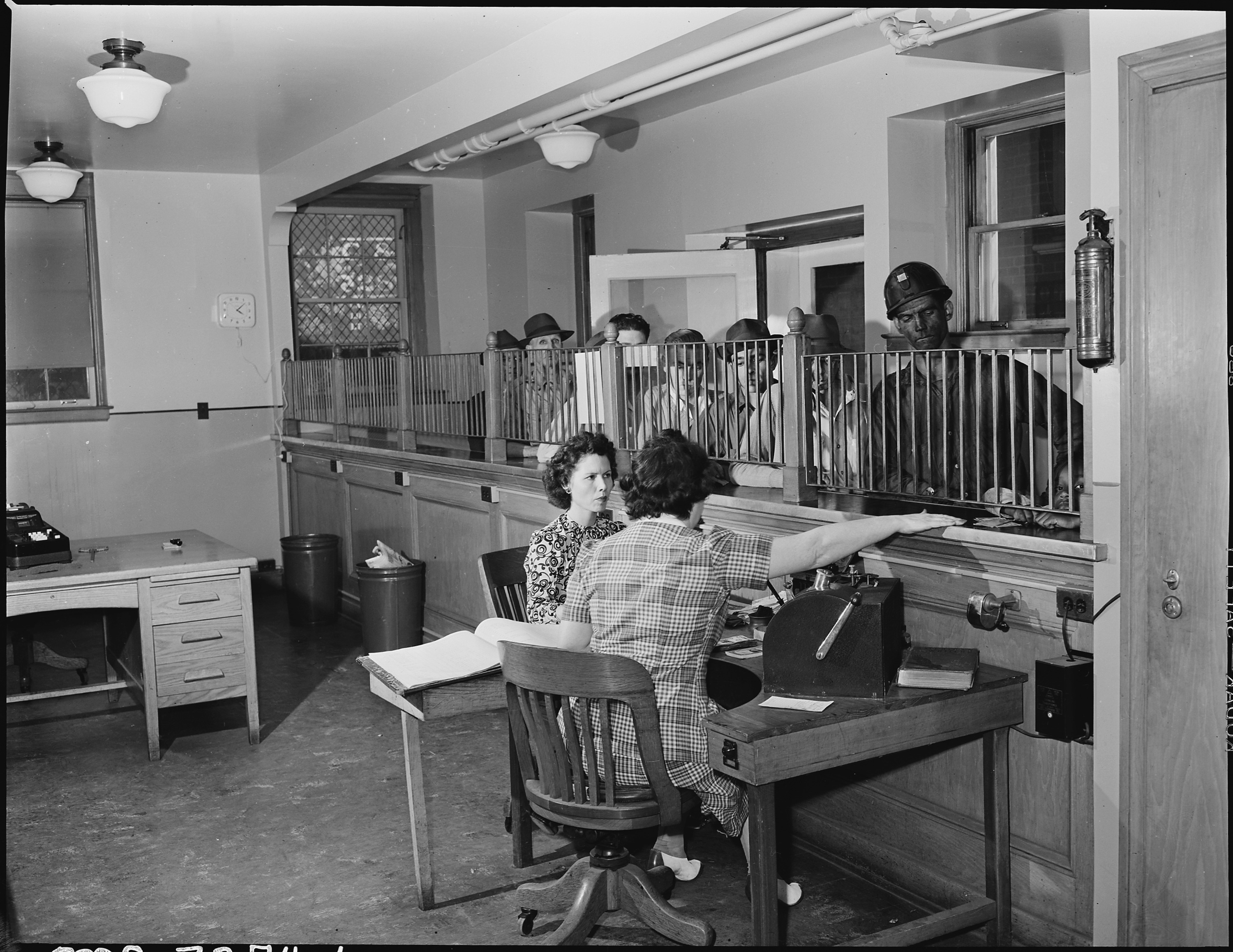
Miners borrowing from their paycheck, 1946

Payday lenders get competition from credit unions, banks, and major financial institutions, which fund the Center for Responsible Lending, a non-profit that fights against payday loans.

Uber and Lyft offer Instant Pay and Express Pay for their drivers.

The website NerdWallet helps redirect potential payday borrowers to non-profit organizations with lower interest rates or to government organizations that provide short-term assistance. Its revenue comes from commissions on credit cards and other financial services that are also offered on the site.

The practice of lending to trusted friends and relatives can involve embarrassment for the borrower. The impersonal nature of a payday loan is a way to avoid this embarrassment. Tim Lohrentz, the program manager of the Insight Center for Community Economic Development, suggested that it might be best to borrow from people you know to save a lot of money instead of trying to avoid embarrassment.

== Economic effects ==
While designed to provide consumers with emergency liquidity, payday loans divert money away from consumer spending and towards paying interest rates. Some major banks offer payday loans with interest rates of 225 to 300 percent, while storefront and online payday lenders charge rates of 200 to 500 percent. Online loans are predicted to account for 60% of payday loans by 2016. In 2011, $774 million of consumer spending was lost to repaying payday loans and $169 million was lost to 56,230 bankruptcies related to payday loans. Additionally, 14,000 jobs were lost. By 2013, twelve million people were taking out a payday loan each year. On average, each borrower is supplied with $375 in emergency cash from each payday loan and the borrower pays $520 per year in interest. Each borrower takes out an average of eight of these loans in a year. In 2011, over a third of bank customers took out more than 20 payday loans.

Potentially, some positive attributes of payday loans exist. Borrowers may be able to use payday loans to avoid more-expensive late fees charged by utilities and other household creditors, and the use of payday loans could prevent overdraft fees which would otherwise have been charged to the borrower's checking account.

Although borrowers typically have payday loan debt for much longer than the loan's advertised two-week period, averaging about 200 days of debt, most borrowers have an accurate idea of when they will have paid off their loans. About 60% of borrowers pay off their loans within two weeks of the days they predict.

When interest rates on payday loans were capped to 150% in Oregon, causing a mass exit from the industry and preventing borrowers from taking out payday loans, there was a negative effect with bank overdrafts, late bills, and employment. The effect is in the opposite direction for military personnel. Job performance and military readiness declines with increasing access to payday loans.

== Criticism ==
=== Income ===
Percentage of people in each wage bracket that have used a payday loan service
Under $15k	9%
$15k to under $25k	11%
$25k to under $30k	8%
$30k to under $40k	8%
$40k to under $50k	5%
$50k to under $75k	4%
$75k to under $100k	3%
$100k and higher	1%

Payday loans are marketed towards low-income individuals making them part of the larger "poverty industry" consisting of businesses that make money primarily from the poor. Without collateral, low income applicants will have trouble obtaining low interest loans and will sometimes reluctantly accept high interest rate loans. The study found payday lenders to target the young and the poor, especially those populations and low-income communities near military bases. The Consumer Financial Protection Bureau states that renters, and not homeowners, are more likely to use these loans. It also states that people who are married, disabled, separated or divorced are likely consumers. Payday loan rates are high relative to those of traditional banks and do not encourage savings or asset accumulation. This property will be exhausted in low-income groups. Many people do not know that the borrowers' higher interest rates are likely to send them into a "debt spiral" where the borrower must constantly renew.

A 2012 study by Pew Charitable research found that the majority of payday loans were taken out to bridge the gap of everyday expenses rather than for unexpected emergencies. The study found that 69% of payday loans are borrowed for recurring expenses, 16% were attributed to unexpected emergencies, 8% for special purchases, and 2% for other expenses.

=== Race ===
Black and Latino people have made up a "disproportionally high percentage" of customers, according to a paper written by Jim Hawkins, a law professor, and Tiffany Penner, a law student, both at the University of Houston.

=== Defaulted loans ===
The Center for Responsible Lending found that almost half of payday loan borrowers will default on their loan within the first two years. Taking out payday loans increases the difficulty of paying the mortgage, rent, and utility bills. The possibility of increased economic difficulties leads to homelessness and delays in medical care, sometimes causing dire health consequences that could have been prevented otherwise. For military men, using payday loans lowers overall performance and shortens service periods. To limit the issuance of military payday loans, the 2007 Military Lending Act established an interest rate ceiling of 36% on military payday loans. A 2013 article by Dobbie and Skiba found that more than 19% of initial loans in their study ended in default. Based on this, Dobbie and Skiba claim that the payday loan market is high risk.

=== Premium pricing structure ===
A 2012 Pew Charitable Trusts study found that the average borrower took out eight loans of $375 each and paid interest of $520 across the loans.

The equation for the annual cost of a loan in percent is:

$[(\text{Loan cost}/\text{Loan amount})/\text{Days borrowed}] * 365 \text{ days}$

=== Asymmetric information ===
The payday loan industry takes advantage of the fact that most borrowers do not know how to calculate their loan's APR and do not realize that they are being charged rates up to 390% interest annually. Critics of payday lending cite the possibility that transactions with in the payday market may reflect a market failure that is due to asymmetric information or the borrowers' cognitive biases or limitations.

The formula for the total cost of a Payday loan is:

$N * ( 1 + i ) ^ x$

where $N$ is the money people borrowed from the payday loan, $i$ is the interest rate per period (not annual), and $x$ is the number of borrowing periods, which are typically 2 weeks long.

For example, a $100 payday loan with a 15% 2-week interest rate will have to be repaid as $115, but if it was not paid on time, within 20 weeks it will be $404.56. In 48 weeks it will be $2,862.52. The interest could be much larger than expected if the loan is not returned on time.

=== Debt trap ===
A debt trap is defined as "A situation in which a debt is difficult or impossible to repay, typically because high interest payments prevent repayment of the principal." According to the Center for Responsible Lending, 76% of the total volume of payday loans are due to loan churning, where loans are taken out within two weeks of a previous loan. The center states that the devotion of 25–50 percent of the borrowers' paychecks leaves most borrowers with inadequate funds, compelling them to take new payday loans immediately. The borrowers will continue to pay high percentages to float the loan across longer time periods, effectively placing them in a debt trap.

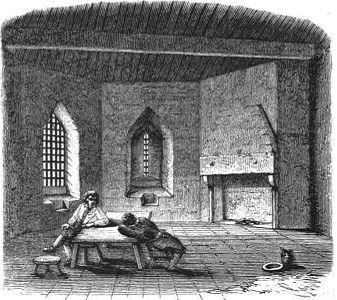
St Briavels Castle debtors prison

=== Debtors' prison ===
Debtors' prisons were federally banned in 1833, but over a third of states in 2011 allowed late borrowers to be jailed. In Texas, some payday loan companies file criminal complaints against late borrowers. Texas courts and prosecutors become de facto collections agencies that warn borrowers that they could face arrest, criminal charges, jail time, and fines. On top of the debts owed, district attorneys charge additional fees. Threatening to pursue criminal charges against borrowers is illegal when a post-dated check is involved, but using checks dated for the day the loan is given allows lenders to claim theft. Borrowers have been jailed for owing as little as $200. Most borrowers who failed to pay had lost their jobs or had their hours reduced at work.

== See also ==
- Community Financial Services Association of America
- Buckeye Check Cashing, Inc. v. Cardegna
- Operation Choke Point
