= Ed Lewis (Missouri politician) =

Missouri politician

Member of the Missouri House of Representatives from the 6th district
- Incumbent
- Assumed office January 9, 2021
- Preceded by: Tim Remole
- Succeeded by: Kelly Gatts (elect)

Personal details
- Born: Edwin Lewis Savannah, Missouri, U.S.
- Party: Republican
- Spouse: Sarah Lewis
- Children: 4
- Education: University of Missouri; Pittsburg State University

Edwin "Ed" Lewis is an American educator and politician in the Missouri House of Representatives, elected in November 2020 to represent District 6, and is a registered member of the Republican Party. Lewis was subsequently re-elected to this office in 2022 and 2024, running wholly unopposed in the former.

During his third term in 2026, Rep. Lewis announced his intention to run for the Missouri Senate instead of seeking a fourth and final term in the Missouri House, running in the state's 18th district to succeed Cindy O'Laughlin, the term-limited president pro tempore of the state legislature's upper chamber. O'Laughlin later endorsed Lewis' bid to succeed her. Within the primary field, he ultimately placed third, being defeated by his colleague, state Rep. Greg Sharpe.

Rep. Lewis publicly endorsed and campaigned in favor of the unsuccessful Amendment 4 ballot measure in 2026, which would have amended the Missouri Constitution and required voter approval in all eight of Missouri's congressional districts in order for future citizen-led ballot measures to pass into law. The proposed amendment was defeated by a supermajority of Missouri voters.

== Missouri House of Representatives ==
=== Committee assignments ===
- Budget
- Rural Community Development
- Utilities
- Workforce Development
- Subcommittee on Appropriations—Education

== Personal life ==
Lewis was born in Savannah, Missouri. He attended high school in St. Joseph and is an alumnus of both the University of Missouri and Pittsburg State University. He is married to his wife Sarah, with whom he has four children. The Lewises are practicing Christians and currently reside in Moberly, Missouri. For more than three decades and prior to serving in the Missouri House of Representatives, Lewis was an educator at both the high school and collegiate levels.

== Electoral history ==
Missouri House of Representatives Election, November 3, 2020 District 6
Party	Candidate	Votes	%	±%
Republican	Ed Lewis	13,064	76.9%	+4.2%
Democratic	Terrence Fiala	3,962	23.1%	−4.2%

Missouri House of Representatives Election, November 8, 2022, District 6
Party	Candidate	Votes	%	±%
Republican	Ed Lewis	10,497	100.00%	+23.1

Missouri House of Representatives Election, November 5, 2024 District 6
Party	Candidate	Votes	%	±%
Republican	Ed Lewis	13,234	78.5%	−21.5%
Democratic	John Akins	3,622	21.5%	+21.5%
