= Operation Choke Point =

US government action against banks

- Operation name: Operation Choke Point
- Type: Bank Fraud Enforcement action

Participants
- Planned by: United States Department of Justice

Mission
- Target: Payday loan providers, Firearms industry, Fireworks industry

Timeline
- Date begin: 2013 or before
- Date end: August 17, 2017

Operation Choke Point was an initiative of the United States Department of Justice beginning in 2013 which investigated banks in the United States and the business they did with firearm dealers, payday lenders, and other companies that, while operating legally, were said to be at a high risk for fraud and money laundering.

This operation, disclosed in an August 2013 Wall Street Journal story, was officially ended in August 2017, and the Federal Deposit Insurance Corporation (FDIC) settled multiple lawsuits by promising to Congress additional training for its examiners and to cease issuing "informal" and "unwritten suggestions" to banks.

== Details ==
Some merchant categories the FDIC listed as being associated with high-risk activity include (until the FDIC revised the policy in July 2014):

- ammunition sales
- ATM operators
- cable box de-scramblers
- coin dealers
- credit card schemes
- credit repair services
- dating services
- debt consolidation scams
- drug paraphernalia
- escort services
- firearms sales
- fireworks sales
- get rich products
- government grants
- home-based charities
- lifetime guarantees
- lifetime memberships
- lottery sales
- mailing lists/personal info
- money transfer networks
- online gambling
- pawn shops
- payday loans
- pharmaceutical sales
- Ponzi schemes
- pornography
- pyramid-type sales
- racist materials
- surveillance equipment
- telemarketing
- tobacco sales
- travel clubs

== Results ==
In April 2014, Four Oaks Bank settled with the Department of Justice for engaging in the types of activities that Operation Choke Point was intended to stop. According to the complaint (dated January 8, 2014): "As of today, approximately 97 percent of TPPP-TX's merchants for which Four Oaks Bank permits debits to consumers' accounts are Internet payday lenders. A payday loan typically is a short-term, high interest loan that is not secured (made without collateral) and that has a repayment date coinciding with or close to the borrower's next payday. Most payday loans are for $250 to $700. Annualized interest rates for Internet payday loans frequently range from 400 percent to 1,800 percent or more – far in excess of most states' usury laws."

On April 17, 2014, Kevin Wack of American Banker reported that Fifth Third Bank and Capital One had terminated their accounts with payday lenders amid alleged increased scrutiny by federal regulators. Wack notes that "in a recent submission to a congressional committee, the Financial Service Centers of America, a trade group that represents check cashers and payday lenders, listed several banks that it says have terminated their relationships with at least one of its member companies in recent months. Besides Capital One and Fifth Third, banks on the list include Bank of America, PNC Financial Services Group, Wells Fargo and U.S. Bancorp."

The Financial Service Centers of America (a trade group that represents payday lenders and other consumer businesses) recently commissioned a survey of its members about bank discontinuance. The survey, conducted by Deloitte Financial Advisory Services, found that "14 of the 61 banking relationships reported by survey participants have been terminated since November 2013."

On March 10, 2015, the U.S. Department of Justice announced a civil and criminal settlement with Commerce West Bank, located in Irvine, California for its role in facilitating a third-party processor's millions of dollars' worth of unauthorized debits from consumer bank accounts. From the Dept. of Justice press release:

These merchants included a fraudulent telemarketing company and a company that charged hundreds of thousands of victims for a payday loan referral fee they had never authorized. ... Commerce West also received complaints and inquiries from other banks, which expressed their belief that their Internet transactions were fraudulent. ... Even in the face of these explicit warnings from other banks, Commerce West did not terminate their Internet transactions or file a Suspicious Activity Report, an alert banks are required to file with the government indicating the presence of suspicious illegal activity.

== Reaction ==
Frank Keating of the American Bankers Association complained that Choke Point was "asking banks to identify customers" who are "simply doing something government officials don't like. Banks then "choke off' those customers' access to financial services, shutting down their accounts."

In August 2014, U.S. Representative Blaine Luetkemeyer introduced a bill that would limit law enforcement's ability to restrict access to the banking system as a response against Operation Choke Point.

On April 8, 2014, the House Financial Services Committee held a hearing with the general counsels of the federal banking agencies regarding, among other things, Operation Choke Point. Committee members from both parties argued that Operation Choke Point was hurting lawful non-bank financial service providers by pressuring to eliminate access to the banking system and, in turn, the businesses were unable to offer services to constituents. The FDIC's Richard Osterman repeatedly asserted that Operation Choke Point was a Justice Department operation and the FDIC's participation was limited to providing information and guidance upon request. Mr. Osterman also asserted that the FDIC was not attempting to prohibit banks from offering products or services to non-bank financial service providers operating within the law.

=== Criticism ===
Critics of the operation accused it of bypassing due process arguing that the government was pressuring the financial industry to cut off companies' access to banking services including access to capital, without first having shown that the targeted companies are violating the law. Critics also argued that it was a "thinly veiled ideological attack on industries the Obama administration doesn't like, such as gun sellers and coal producers."

On May 29, 2014, the U.S. House of Representatives Committee on Oversight and Government Reform published a highly critical staff report that concluded:

Forceful prosecution of those who defraud American consumers is both responsible and admirable. However, Department of Justice initiatives to combat mass-market consumer fraud must be legitimate exercises of the Department's legal authorities, and must be executed in a manner that does not unfairly harm legitimate merchants and individuals. Operation Choke Point fails both these requirements. The Department's radical reinterpretation of what constitutes an actionable violation under § 951 of FIRREA fundamentally distorts Congress' intent in enacting the law, and inappropriately demands that bankers act as the moral arbiters and policemen of the commercial world. In light of the Department's obligation to act within the bounds of the law, and its avowed commitment not to "discourage or inhibit" the lawful conduct of honest merchants, it is necessary to disavow and dismantle Operation Choke Point.

On November 21, 2014, William Isaac, the former Chairman of the FDIC from 1981 to 1985, wrote a scathing opinion piece in The Wall Street Journal entitled "Don't Like an Industry? Send a Message to Its Bankers: With Operation Choke Point, the Justice Department's targets have included vendors of firearms and fireworks" stating that he believed that the agency acted in bad faith.

On March 24, 2015, a hearing was held before the Subcommittee on Oversight and Investigations of the House Financial Services Committee. Subcommittee chair Sean P. Duffy said at the outset, "I fear that activists at the DOJ and the FDIC are abusing their power and authority and are going after legal businesses and, in effect, they are weaponizing government to meet their ideological beliefs."

Operation Choke Point has been accused of being harmful to sex workers. Many sex workers have reported having their accounts shut down after years of having accounts. This led to significant financial hardship and is considered a form of discrimination.

== Federal investigations ==
The FDIC and the Department of Justice (DOJ) have launched investigations into the operation.

The FDIC's inspector general, Fred Gibson, said he would review the conduct of agency personnel to find if the "actions and policies of the FDIC were consistent with applicable laws, regulations and policy", as well as the regulator's mission. Gibson said he would investigate allegations that FDIC General Counsel Richard Osterman provided false testimony to Congress earlier that year when discussing his organization's activities. Osterman was testifying to the House of Representatives member when he rejected assertions that the FDIC wanted to cut off legitimate businesses' use of the financial system.

The FDIC Office of Inspector General found that the FDIC's involvement in Operation Choke Point was limited and inconsequential to the overall direction and outcome of the initiative. It further found no evidence that the FDIC targeted financial institutions. However, references to the high-risk activity list did create a perception – especially among Payday lenders – that the FDIC discouraged institutions from conducting business with high-risk merchants. Furthermore, the investigation identified internal communications and actions by certain officials (including the Deputy Director) that were inconsistent with FDIC policy regarding payday lenders and ACH processing.

== Conclusion ==
On January 29, 2015, the FDIC issued a Financial Institution Letter that states "The Federal Deposit Insurance Corporation (FDIC) issued a Financial Institution Letter today encouraging supervised institutions to take a risk-based approach in assessing individual customer relationships, rather than declining to provide banking services to entire categories of customers without regard to the risks presented by an individual customer or the financial institution's ability to manage the risk."

The Washington Times says this letter "effectively ends Operation Choke Point." As reported by Forbes, "a change in the political landscape, many businesses threatening legal action and a congressman with a background in banking [forced] the bureaucracy to admit to misconduct and to stop financial attacks on legal businesses that the Obama administration deems to be politically incorrect." Reports of continued termination of services to legitimate businesses, however, continued.

On May 25, 2017, U.S. Representative Blaine Luetkemeyer, of the House Financial Services Committee, introduced The Financial Institution Customer Protection Act of 2017, which specified that a federal banking agency may not request or order a depository institution to terminate a customer account unless the agency has a valid reason to do so and that reason is not based solely on reputation risk. Valid reasons included risks to national security and terrorism. The bill passed with only two nay votes.

On August 17, 2017, the U.S. Department of Justice, under the Trump Administration, announced that the Obama Administration's Operation Choke Point would officially end, stating that it was hurting legitimate businesses instead of preventing fraud as intended. Lawsuits against the FDIC by payday lenders were subsequently settled.

== See also ==
- Abuse of power
- Bank Secrecy Act of 1970
- ATMIA (ATM Industry Association)
