= Paul Quinn (Missouri politician) =

American politician

Member of the Missouri House of Representatives from the 9th district
- In office January 2007 – January 2013
- Preceded by: Wes Shoemyer
- Succeeded by: Jim Hansen

Personal details
- Born: October 31, 1943 (age 82) Hannibal, Missouri
- Party: Democratic
- Spouse: Judy (deceased)
- Profession: Farmer; Politician

Paul Quinn (born October 31, 1943) is an American politician from the state of Missouri. A Democrat, he served as a member of the Missouri House of Representatives from the 9th District from 2007 to 2012. The district formerly encompassed all or parts of Audrain, Boone, Chariton, Howard and Monroe counties. However, due to redistricting following the 2010 United States Census, Quinn's district was redrawn, placing him in the 40th District. He was defeated in the 40th District race by Republican Jim Hansen in November, 2012. He was first elected to the Missouri House in 2006.

== Personal history ==
Paul Quinn was born in Hannibal, Missouri and raised in Monroe County. He engaged in farming for over thirty years before entering politics full-time, and still resides on the family farm near Monroe City. A widower, Paul Quinn and his wife Judy raised nine children. One daughter, Sarah (Quinn) Deien is a longtime reporter and morning news anchor for KHQA-TV Hannibal/Quincy. Quinn is a member of St. Stephens Indian Creek Church. St. Stephens Knights of Columbus, and the Missouri Farmers Union.

== Political history ==
Prior to entering state politics Paul Quinn served as Monroe County Assessor, and as a Monroe County Commissioner for twelve years. Quinn was first elected to the Missouri House in 2006, first beating fellow Democrat Ewell Lawson in the August primary, then defeating Republican Kathyrne Harper in November to succeed Wes Shoemyer. Rep. Quinn ran unopposed for reelection in both 2008 and 2010.

Under Missouri term limit law Rep. Quinn was allowed to run for a final two-year term in 2012. However Missouri House district boundaries were redrawn after the 2010 U.S. Census and Quinn found his home of record now in the 40th District. Quinn was unopposed in the August, 2012 Democratic Primary for the 40th District, but lost a close contest in the November general election to Republican challenger Jim Hansen.

Missouri 9th District State Representative Election 2006
Party	Candidate	Votes	%	±%
Republican	Kathyrne Harper	6,041	43.2	
Democratic	Paul Quinn	7,931	56.8	Winner

Missouri 40th District State Representative Election 2012
Party	Candidate	Votes	%	±%
Republican	Jim Hansen	7,999	51.9	Winner
Democratic	Paul Quinn	7,417	48.1	

=== Legislative assignments ===
During the 96th General Assembly Rep. Quinn served on the following committees:

- Administration and Accounts
- Agriculture Policy
- Appropriations - Agriculture and Natural Resources subcommittee
- Corrections
- Local Government
- Joint Committee on Government Accountability
