= Independent ATM deployer =

Non-financial institution that manages ATM

An independent ATM deployer (IAD) is a non-financial institution that owns, manages, and places ATMs (cash machines) in retail premises or elsewhere known as white-label ATMs. IADs emerged in the 1990s in the USA while working alongside depository institutions, such as banks or building societies, to allow people to access cash.

== See also ==
- ATM Industry Association (ATMIA)
