= Kelly Gatts =

American politician

Member-elect of the Missouri House of Representatives from the 6th district
- Assuming office January 6, 2027
- Succeeding: Ed Lewis

Personal details
- Party: Republican
- Education: Truman State University
- Website: www.kellygattsformo.com

Kelly Gatts is an American politician of the Missouri Republican Party who is the representative-elect for the 6th district in the Missouri House of Representatives. He was elected in the 2026 general election. He is a small business owner.
