= Tom Shively =

American politician

Member of the Missouri House of Representatives from the 8th district
- Preceded by: Kathy L. Chinn

Personal details
- Born: November 11, 1946 (age 79) Hannibal, Missouri
- Party: Democratic
- Spouse: Rose Shively
- Education: University of Missouri
- Profession: Teacher; Farmer

Tom Shively (born November 11, 1946) is a Democratic member of the Missouri House of Representatives. He represents the 8th District, encompassing all or portions of Linn, Macon, Shelby and Sullivan counties. Due to Missouri House redistricting Shively ran for the newly created Missouri House 5th district in November, 2012. He lost to Republican Lindell Shumake, who until redistricting had represented the Missouri House 6th district. Shively will continue to represent the 8th district until January, 2013.

== Personal history ==
Thomas Shively was born in Hannibal, Missouri and raised in Shelby county. After graduating from North Shelby High School in 1964 he attended the University of Missouri in Columbia, earning a Bachelor of Science degree in Agriculture in 1968. Representative Shively served in United States Air Force, and taught vocational agriculture at northeast Missouri schools for over three decades. When not involved with legislative duties Shively works with one of his sons in a cattle and row crop farming operation. Tom Shively and his wife Rose are the parents of three children.

== Political history ==
Tom Shively first ran for the Missouri House of Representatives in 2002, losing to Chris Shoemaker. He ran for the House again in 2004, losing to Kathy L. Chinn. On his third attempt in 2006 Tom Shively was finally victorious, defeating Chinn in a rematch from 2004. He was subsequently reelected in 2008 and 2010. New Missouri House district boundaries meant that Shively faced Republican Lindell Shumake whose 6th district seat had also been affected by redistricting. Shively lost the November general election 56 to 44 percent.

Missouri 8th District State Representative Election 2002
Party	Candidate	Votes	%	±%
Republican	Chris Shoemaker	7,019	57.9	Winner
Democratic	Tom Shively	5,104	42.1	

Missouri 8th District State Representative Election 2004
Party	Candidate	Votes	%	±%
Republican	Kathy L. Chinn	8,361	51.7	Winner
Democratic	Tom Shively	7,809	48.3	

Missouri 8th District State Representative Election 2006
Party	Candidate	Votes	%	±%
Republican	Kathy L. Chinn	6,482	49.0	
Democratic	Tom Shively	6,734	51.0	Winner

Missouri 8th District State Representative Election 2008
Party	Candidate	Votes	%	±%
Republican	Mike Austin	7,327	45.8	
Democratic	Tom Shively	8,655	54.2	Winner

Missouri 8th District State Representative Election 2010
Party	Candidate	Votes	%	±%
Republican	William Jesse Foster	5,067	40.5	
Democratic	Tom Shively	7,444	59.5	Winner

Missouri 5th District State Representative Election 2012
Party	Candidate	Votes	%	±%
Republican	Lindell Shumake	9,093	56	Winner
Democratic	Tom Shively	7,140	44	

=== Legislative assignments ===
Representative Shively will serve on the following committees during the 96th General Assembly:

- Agriculture Policy
- Appropriations - Agriculture and Natural Resources subcommittee
- Budget
- Elementary and Secondary Education
