= Wes Shoemyer =

American politician

Member of the Missouri Senate from the 18th district
- In office 2007 - 2011
- Preceded by: John W. Cauthorn
- Succeeded by: Brian Munzlinger

Member of the Missouri House of Representatives from the 9th district
- In office 2001 - 2007
- Preceded by: Sam D. Leake
- Succeeded by: Paul Quinn

Personal details
- Born: March 30, 1961 (age 65) Hannibal, Missouri
- Party: Democratic
- Spouse: Cheryl
- Occupation: farmer

Wes Shoemyer (born March 30, 1961, in Hannibal, Missouri) is a former Senator for the eighteenth district of the Missouri Senate. The district includes all or portions of thirteen counties in northeast Missouri: Adair, Audain, Clark, Knox, Lewis, Marion, Monroe, Pike, Putnam, Ralls, Schuyler, Scotland, and Shelby.

== Personal ==
Shoemyer was raised in Shelby County, Missouri and graduated from South Shelby R-IV High School in 1979. He attended the University of Missouri. Shoemyer and wife Cheryl live on their rural Monroe County farm with their three daughters and one son.

== Political history ==
Shoemyer was elected to the Missouri House of Representatives in 2000 representing the 9th district. He won the 2006 election for the seat that was vacated by John Cauthorn. He defeated Bob Behnen, a former Representative for the second district of the Missouri House of Representatives. Shoemyer won by 1,842 votes, or 3.4%. In the 2010 general election, Shoemyer was defeated by Republican Brian Munzlinger.

Missouri 18th District State Senate Election 2006
Party	Candidate	Votes	%	±%
Republican	Bob Behnen	26,953	48.3%	
Democratic	Wes Shoemyer	28,795	51.7%	Winner

Missouri 18th District State Senate Election 2010
Party	Candidate	Votes	%	±%
Republican	Brian Munzlinger	30,532	58.3%	Winner
Democratic	Wes Shoemyer	21,813	41.7%	

Preceded by John W. Cauthorn	Missouri State Senator - 18th District; 2007 – 2011	Succeeded by Brian Munzlinger
