= Keith Gudehus =

American politician

Member-elect of the Missouri House of Representatives from the 4th district
- Assuming office January 2027
- Succeeding: Greg Sharpe

Personal details
- Party: Republican

Keith Gudehus is an American politician. A member of the Republican Party, he is the member-elect for the 4th district of the Missouri House of Representatives.
