= Jerry Schad =

American educator and nonfiction writer

Jerry Schad (also known as Gerald Schad, November 3, 1949 – September 22, 2011) was an American educator and nonfiction writer, who documented local hiking trails in San Diego, Orange County and Southern California.

His book Afoot & Afield San Diego County is considered the local bible of hiking.

The Jerry Schad Observatory was dedicated by San Diego Mesa College on the rooftop of the Math and Science building of the community college. Jerry Schad Memorial Trail was dedicated at Balboa Park in honor of him.
