= Lindell Shumake =

American politician (born 1949)

Member of the Missouri House of Representatives from the 5th district
- In office January 7, 2013 – January 2019
- Preceded by: Glen Klippenstein
- Succeeded by: Louis Riggs

Member of the Missouri House of Representatives from the 6th district
- In office January, 2011 – January 7, 2013
- Preceded by: Rachel Bringer
- Succeeded by: Tim Remole

Personal details
- Born: December 24, 1949 (age 76) St. Louis, Missouri
- Party: Republican
- Spouse: Lydia Shumake
- Education: Hannibal-LaGrange College; Quincy University
- Profession: Small business owner Hospital chaplain

Lindell Shumake (born December 24, 1949) is a Republican former member of the Missouri House of Representatives. Shumake first represented the 6th District, encompassing all or portions of Marion and Ralls counties in northeast Missouri. In November 2012, he was elected to serve the newly designated 5th Missouri House district.

== Personal history ==
Shumake was born in St. Louis, Missouri and raised in Hannibal, Missouri. After graduation from Hannibal High School in 1968, he served in the U.S. Army, including a one-year tour during the Vietnam War. Following his military service, Shumake attended Hannibal-LaGrange College, earning an associate degree in 1974, and a bachelor's degree in Sociology in 1976 from Quincy College. Shumake worked for the Missouri Division of Family Services as a caseworker beginning in 1977 and remain with the agency until 1997. Since retiring as a state representative, Shumate runs two small businesses in the Hannibal area as well as serving as a chaplain at Hannibal Regional Hospital. He was ordained as a minister in 1974. Shumake married his wife Lydia in 1975 and they have one daughter.

== Political history ==
Shumake first ran for the 10th District Missouri House seat in 1998 but was defeated by Robert Clayton. His 2010 bid proved more successful as he beat Democrat Carl Thompson of Monroe City with fifty-seven percent of the vote.

Due to Missouri House redistricting following the 2010 U.S. Census, new boundaries were created for the Missouri House 6th. Shumake ran for the newly created 5th Missouri House district in 2012, where he defeated Democrat Tom Shively, who had represented the 8th under its previous boundaries. Shumake assumed the new district in January 2013.

Missouri 10th District State Representative Election 1998
Party	Candidate	Votes	%	±%
Republican	Lindell Shumake	3,546	36.1	
Democratic	Robert Clayton	6,279	63.9	Winner

Missouri 6th District State Representative Election 2010
Party	Candidate	Votes	%	±%
Republican	Lindell Shumake	6,564	57.3	Winner
Democratic	Carl Thompson	4,892	42.7	

Missouri 5th District State Representative Election 2012
Party	Candidate	Votes	%	±%
Republican	Lindell Shumake	9,093	56	Winner
Democratic	Tom Shively	7,140	44	

=== Legislative assignments ===
Shumake served on the following House committees during the 96th General Assembly:

- Agri-Business
- Elementary and Secondary Education
- Small Business
- Tax Reform

==== Legislation sponsored ====
Shumake was a co-sponsor of Missouri HB283, which requires proof of identity and U.S. citizenship for all presidential and vice-presidential candidates.
