= ATM Industry Association =

Trade association promoting automated teller machines

ATMIA
- Type: Nonprofit
- Industry: Banking, Cash machines
- Founded: 1997; 29 years ago
- Headquarters: Sioux Falls, South Dakota, US
- Revenue: 10,000 United States dollar (2015)
- Total assets: 1 United States dollar (2015)
- Website: www.atmia.com

The ATM Industry Association (ATMIA), originally the ATM Owners Association, was established in 1997 in the United States as a global nonprofit trade association to service an industry that built around the global growth of the ATM.

== History ==
Liberalization of the retail banking markets in the US during the 1980s and early 1990s, resulted in depository institutions losing their monopoly on ATMs while independent ATM deployers were allowed to compete in the provision of after-hours access to cash. Growth in this market led Tom Harper and Alan Fryrear to establish the ATM Owners' Association (ATMOA) in late 1997 with no staff (except Harper), zero budget, and only a handful of members. The first official ATMOA planning meeting took place on October 9, 1998, at the end of the Faulkner & Gray Advanced ATM Conference in San Diego, California. The group voted Lyle Elias as the new president, ratified a motion to change their name to the ATM Industry Association, formed several committees and took steps to launch their own industry conference.

In 2000, Michael Lee joined ATMIA as their European executive director and in 2004, he was named chief executive officer and board member.

Progress in bringing industry participants together resulted in the New York Times identifying ATMIA as "the leading trade group" in the global cash distribution industry in 2003.

In 2016, ATMIA had over 8,000 members in 66 countries. The membership base included banks and other depository institutions, IADs, payment card companies, cash management service companies, interbank network companies, ATM design and manufacturing companies, and other related service providers.

== Impact ==
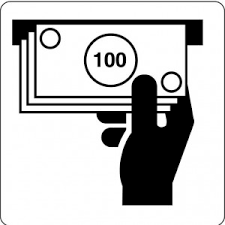
Official Global Pictogram for the ATM, 2001 (registered as international public sign in 2008)

ATMIA provides a forum for common issues among members. These include technical matters such as coordinating the global adoption of operating systems, promoting industry specific networking tools, advising on security of transactions, setting common standards to give access to people with disabilities, and the future of the ATM.

It also promoted a worldwide standard for ATM security in collaboration with Accenture, a global ATM benchmarking service. It was responsible for designing a recognizable worldwide "ATM here" sign, based on an international contest won by Andy Kitt, formerly of the NCR Corporation. The "Official Global Pictogram for the ATM", was then registered as an international public sign in 2008 (ISO 7001:PI CF 005).

It has worked with James Shepherd-Barron in humanitarian efforts to facilitate the provision of cash and the extended use of mobile ATMs to victims of disasters and political conflict.

ATMIA members and directors collaborate to address issues of global concern such as the ATM ram raids in Australia in 2010, and in 2012 around money laundering regulations, including a framework for non-bank ATMs in Canada.

ATMIA represents its membership in front of financial authorities and regulators. and also approaches legislators directly This includes the provision of cash services for those in the lower income brackets and other vulnerable consumers. This actions have included studies on worldwide use of banknotes and coins.

== See also ==
- Automated teller machine
- Payment systems
- Australian Payments Network
- Cash and cash equivalents
- Independent ATM deployer
- Operation Choke Point
- Talking ATM
