= Roth McElvain =

American politician

Member-elect of the Missouri House of Representatives from the 5th district
- Assuming office January 6, 2027
- Succeeding: Louis Riggs

Personal details
- Party: Republican
- Website: www.mcelvainformissouri.com

Roth McElvain is an American politician of the Missouri Republican Party who is the representative-elect for the 5th district in the Missouri House of Representatives. He was elected in the 2026 general election. McElvain is a fifth generation farmer.
