= Rodney Schad =

American politician

Member of the Missouri House of Representatives from the 115th district
- In office January 5, 2005 – January 9, 2013
- Preceded by: Blaine Luetkemeyer
- Succeeded by: Elaine Gannon

Personal details
- Born: February 19, 1954 (age 72) Versailles, Missouri
- Party: Republican

Rodney Schad (born February 19, 1954) is an American politician who served in the Missouri House of Representatives from the 115th district from 2005 to 2013.
