= White-label ATM =

Canadian ATMs not affiliated with a bank

White-label automatic banking machines (ABMs) or white-label ATMs are ATMs that offer an alternative to traditional bank-owned ATMs for cash dispensing. These machines may be operated by an independent ATM deployer.

White-label, or "no name," ATMs are commonly found in non-traditional locations, such as grocery stores or other non-bank venues. These machines do not display any major bank branding, and the fees are generally higher compared to those of bank-owned ATMs.

== History ==
In Canada, the major financial institutions have their own branded ABMs located across the country, with these machines prominently displaying the banks' logos. White-label or "no name" ABMs, typically found in non-traditional locations, do not display any major bank labels. Before 1997, only banks and other deposit-taking financial institutions were permitted to participate in the Interac network. After 1997, independent operators were allowed to operate ABMs not owned by major financial institutions.

As of 2012, with a network of over 15,000 units, the NRT Technology Corporation became the largest processor of non-bank ABMs in Canada, processing more than 50 million transactions annually.

In India, the Reserve Bank of India (RBI) permitted non-bank entities to establish, own, and operate ATMs in June 2012. The central bank issued Certificates of Authorisation to eight non-bank entities for setting up and operating WLAs. As of March 2023, over 35,800 White Label ATMs had been deployed in India.

== Fees ==
Customers typically incur an additional fee when using white-label ABMs, which can be divided between the private provider and the property owner hosting the machine.

According to the Financial Consumer Agency of Canada (FCAC), fees for using a white-label ATM can exceed $6.00 per transaction. The agency notes that private operators are not subject to minimum or maximum fee limits, allowing the operator to set the amount. However, operators are required to disclose the fee and provide consumers with the option to cancel the transaction.

CIBC faced criticism for creating a wholly owned subsidiary, Ready Cash, as a white-label company. Many CIBC customers, who typically enjoy free transactions with official CIBC accounts, are charged twice when using Ready Cash—once by Ready Cash and again by CIBC, as it is not classified as a bank.

White-label ATMs are commonly found in local establishments like gas stations, bars, pubs, and restaurants, where retailers receive a fee for each transaction. Most white-label ATMs charge a minimum of C$1.50 per use, with a portion of that fee going to the retailer based on their involvement with the ATM. This fee is in addition to any charges imposed by the cardholder's financial institution.

In India, WLAs allow ATM card holders five free transactions per month. The WLA operator is compensated through an interchange fee paid by the card-issuing bank.

Recently RBI established a committee to review fee structure for white-label ATMs.

=== Notification of fees ===
A warning message will appear before the cardholder confirms the withdrawal, informing them of the service cost. There is always an option to cancel the transaction to avoid incurring the fees.
