= Greg Sharpe =

American politician

Member of the Missouri House of Representatives from the 4th district
- Incumbent
- Assumed office 2019
- Succeeded by: Keith Gudehus (elect)

Personal details
- Born: 1956 (age 69–70) Quincy, Illinois, U.S.
- Party: Republican
- Spouse: Theresa Sharpe
- Children: 2
- Education: Northeast Missouri State University

Greg Sharpe (born 1956) is an American businessman, agriculturalist, and politician. He is a member of the Missouri House of Representatives from the 4th District, serving since 2019. First elected to the House in 2018, Sharpe was then re-elected in 2020, 2022, and 2024. The 2024 election cycle is the only cycle in which Sharpe faced an opponent in the general election, soundly defeating the Democratic nominee, Melissa Viloria. He is a registered member of the Republican Party.

In 2026, Rep. Sharpe became subject to existing term limits in the Missouri House. He subsequently declared his candidacy for Missouri's 18th Senate district, seeking to succeed term-limited Senate president pro tempore Cindy O'Laughlin in the Missouri Senate. Rep. Sharpe did not receive the endorsement of Sen. O'Laughlin during the 2026 Republican primary election.

On August 4, 2026, Sharpe was selected as the Republican nominee for District 18 over opponents Dusty Blue and Sharpe's colleague, state Rep. Ed Lewis.

== Personal life ==
Sharpe was born in Quincy, Illinois. He attended high school in Lewis County. After graduating from high school, Sharpe became a graduate of Northeast Missouri State University in 1978. He later utilized his B.S. in General Agriculture during his three-decade career in corn and soybean farming, as well as running his own seed dealership for over four decades. Sharpe has served in various professional capacities within multiple agricultural agencies, emphasizing his own expertise in soybean cultivation.

He is married to his wife Theresa, and the couple have two children. The Sharpes are practicing Catholics, and the couple currently reside in Ewing, Missouri.

== Electoral history ==
=== State representative ===
- Greg Sharpe was unopposed in the Republican primary elections of 2018, 2020, and 2022.

Missouri House of Representatives election, District 4, November 6, 2018
Party	Candidate	Votes	%	±%
Republican	Greg Sharpe	10,386	100.00%	n/a

Missouri House of Representatives Election, District 4, November 3, 2020
Party	Candidate	Votes	%	±%
Republican	Greg Sharpe	13,613	100.00%	0.00

Missouri House of Representatives Election, November 8, 2022, District 4
Party	Candidate	Votes	%	±%
Republican	Greg Sharpe	10,930	100.00%	0.00
