= John W. Cauthorn =

American politician

John W. Cauthorn (born December 11, 1946, in Audrain County, Missouri) is the current 21st District representative to the Missouri House of Representatives and former Republican member of the Missouri State Senate.

Cauthorn attended Truman State University, and served in the National Guard for six years. He has three children: Elizabeth, Kaitie, and Andrew. He is a member of the Victory Christian Fellowship, Missouri Farm Association, Farm Bureau, Missouri Corn Growers Association, Missouri Cattlemen's Association, and is past president of the Soybean Association. Cauthorn and his family reside in Mexico, Missouri.

Cauthorn was first elected to the State Senate in a special election in 2001, and won re-election the following year. While a state senator he served as chair of the Governmental Accountability and Fisch Oversight Committee, and on the following committees:

- Agriculture, Conservation, Parks and Natural Resources
- Small Business, Insurance, and Industrial Relations
- Ways and Means.

In 2009, he lost the general election for western Audrain County commissioner after being unopposed for the Republican nomination.
