= Robert Schaaf =

American politician

- Born: January 4, 1957 (age 69); St. Louis, Missouri
- Education: Central High School
- Occupation: Doctor
- Known for: Former Republican member of the Missouri Senate, former member of the Missouri House of Representatives

Robert Schaaf (born January 4, 1957) is a doctor, a former Republican member of the Missouri Senate and a former member of the Missouri House of Representatives, and brother to Charles L. Schaaf. He formerly represented the 34th district in the Missouri Senate, which began in 2011 when his term in the Missouri House expired.

Schaaf was born in 1957 in St. Louis, Missouri, moving to St. Joseph as a youth. He graduated from Central High School in St. Joseph in 1975. He went on to Missouri Western State College, where he earned a B.S. in mathematics in 1979, and St. Louis University School of Medicine, where he earned an M.D. in 1983. Schaaf married his wife Deborah that same year.

Schaaf was first elected to the Missouri House of Representatives in 2002, winning reelection in 2004, 2006, and 2008. In 2010, he ran for and won a seat in the Senate, and was reelected in 2014.

== Public profile ==
In 2003, Schaaf sponsored the Infection Control Act which led to a reduction in deadly hospital infections by putting hospital infection information on a publicly available database.

Schaaf passed a House resolution and raised the funds for a granite plaque, displayed in the House chamber with the Preamble to Missouri Constitution, that mentions the name of God.

Schaaf handled the Medicaid reform legislation that changed the name of Missouri Medicaid to "MoHealthNet" and added dental and optometric coverage for Medicaid recipients.

In the Senate, Schaaf sponsored Amendment 3, approved by the voters, adding "electronic communications and data" to the list of protected items under the 4th Amendment. As a result, Missouri Law Enforcement cannot access a person's phone or computer without a warrant based upon probable cause as with other protected papers and effects.

For 15 years, Schaaf opposed, often filibustered and defeated bills that would have created a statewide prescription drug monitoring program, which would have put patients' private medical information regarding controlled substances on a government database accessible by over 30,000 people. Schaaf offered several alternative bills that would have created the PDMP with protections of private identifying information, but those bills were all defeated. After Schaaf was term-limited, 2 years later, Missouri passed the prescription monitoring program sponsored by Senator Holly Rehder, whose daughter became addicted after using prescription drugs.

After being in the legislature, Schaaf worked as a physician in the Missouri Department of Corrections caring for inmates.
