= Brian Munzlinger =

American politician (born 1956)

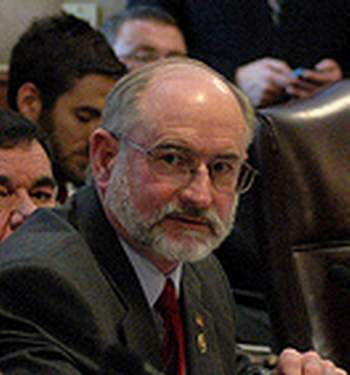

Member of the Missouri Senate from the 18th district
- In office 2011-2019
- Preceded by: Wes Shoemyer
- Succeeded by: Cindy O'Laughlin

Member of the Missouri House of Representatives from the 1st district
- In office 2001 - 2011
- Preceded by: Sam Berkowitz
- Succeeded by: Craig Redmon

Personal details
- Born: April 24, 1956 (age 70) Quincy, Illinois
- Party: Republican
- Spouse: Michele
- Education: University of Missouri
- Occupation: farmer

Brian Munzlinger (born April 24, 1956) is an American politician and farmer from the state of Missouri. A Republican, he is a former member of the Missouri Senate who served the 18th District from 2011 to 2019.

== Personal ==
Brian Munzlinger was born in Quincy, Illinois but raised in rural Lewis County, Missouri. He is a graduate of the University of Missouri, with a B.S. degree in general agriculture. Munzlinger, a third-generation Missouri farmer, his wife, Michele and their two children reside on their farm near Williamstown, Missouri. He attends Monticello United Methodist Church, and is a member of the Missouri Farm Bureau, the Missouri Corn Growers Association, the Missouri Soybean Association, the Missouri Cattleman's Association, the Missouri Chamber of Commerce, NFIB, and the University of Missouri Alumni Association.

== Politics ==
Munzlinger was first elected to represent the 1st District in the Missouri House of Representatives in November 2002, and reelected in 2004, 2006, and 2008. Due to Missouri's term limits he was prevented from running for the House again in 2010. Munzlinger chose to continue his political career at the next level by running for Missouri Senate from the 18th District in 2010. Munzlinger defeated incumbent Democrat Wes Shoemyer.

== Electoral history ==
Missouri 18th District State Senate Election 2010
Party	Candidate	Votes	%	±%
Republican	Brian Munzlinger	30,532	58.3%	Winner
Democratic	Wes Shoemyer	21,813	41.7%	
