= Diebold Nixdorf =

American multinational financial and retail technology company

Diebold Nixdorf, Incorporated
- Type: Public
- Traded as: NYSE: DBD; Russell 2000 component; S&P 600 component
- ISIN: US2536511031
- Industry: Technology; Banking & Retail
- Founded: 1859; 167 years ago (as Diebold Bahmann Safe Company) in Cincinnati, Ohio, US
- Founder: Charles Diebold; Heinz Nixdorf
- Headquarters: North Canton, Ohio, United States
- Area served: Worldwide
- Key people: Octavio Marquez (CEO)
- Products: Automated teller machines, banking-industry services and software, point-of-sale technology, retail industry services and software, drive-through banking equipment, safes, vaults
- Revenue: ▲US$3.75 billion (2024)
- Operating income: ▲US$182 million (2024)
- Net income: ▼US$−15 million (2024)
- Total assets: ▼US$3.54 billion (2024)
- Total equity: ▼US$938 million (2024)
- Number of employees: c. 21,000 (2024)
- Divisions: Eurasia Banking, Americas Banking, Retail
- Subsidiaries: Procomp Industria Eletronica LTDA, Phoenix Interactive Design, Cryptera, etc.
- Website: dieboldnixdorf.com

Diebold Nixdorf, Incorporated is an American multinational financial and retail technology company based in North Canton, Ohio. It specializes in the sale, manufacture, installation, and service of self-service transaction systems (such as ATMs and currency processing systems), point-of-sale terminals, physical security products, and software and related services for global financial, retail, and commercial markets. Diebold Nixdorf has a presence in around 130 countries, and the company employs approximately 23,000 people.

Founded in 1859 in Cincinnati, Ohio as the Diebold Bahmann Safe Company, the company eventually changed its name to Diebold Safe & Lock Company. In 1921, Diebold Safe & Lock Company sold the world's largest commercial bank vault to Detroit National Bank. Diebold has since branched into diverse markets, and is currently the largest provider of ATMs in the United States. Diebold Nixdorf was founded when Diebold Inc. acquired Germany's Wincor Nixdorf in 2016. It is estimated that Wincor Nixdorf controlled about 35 percent of the global ATM market.

On June 1, 2023, Diebold Nixdorf filed for Chapter 11 bankruptcy, saying it reached an agreement to restructure and reduce its debt by $2.1 billion. Its stock was also delisted from the New York Stock Exchange. In August 2023, Diebold Nixdorf emerged from Chapter 11 bankruptcy and rejoined the NYSE.

== Diebold history ==
=== Diebold Safe & Lock Company to Diebold, Incorporated (1859-1960s) ===
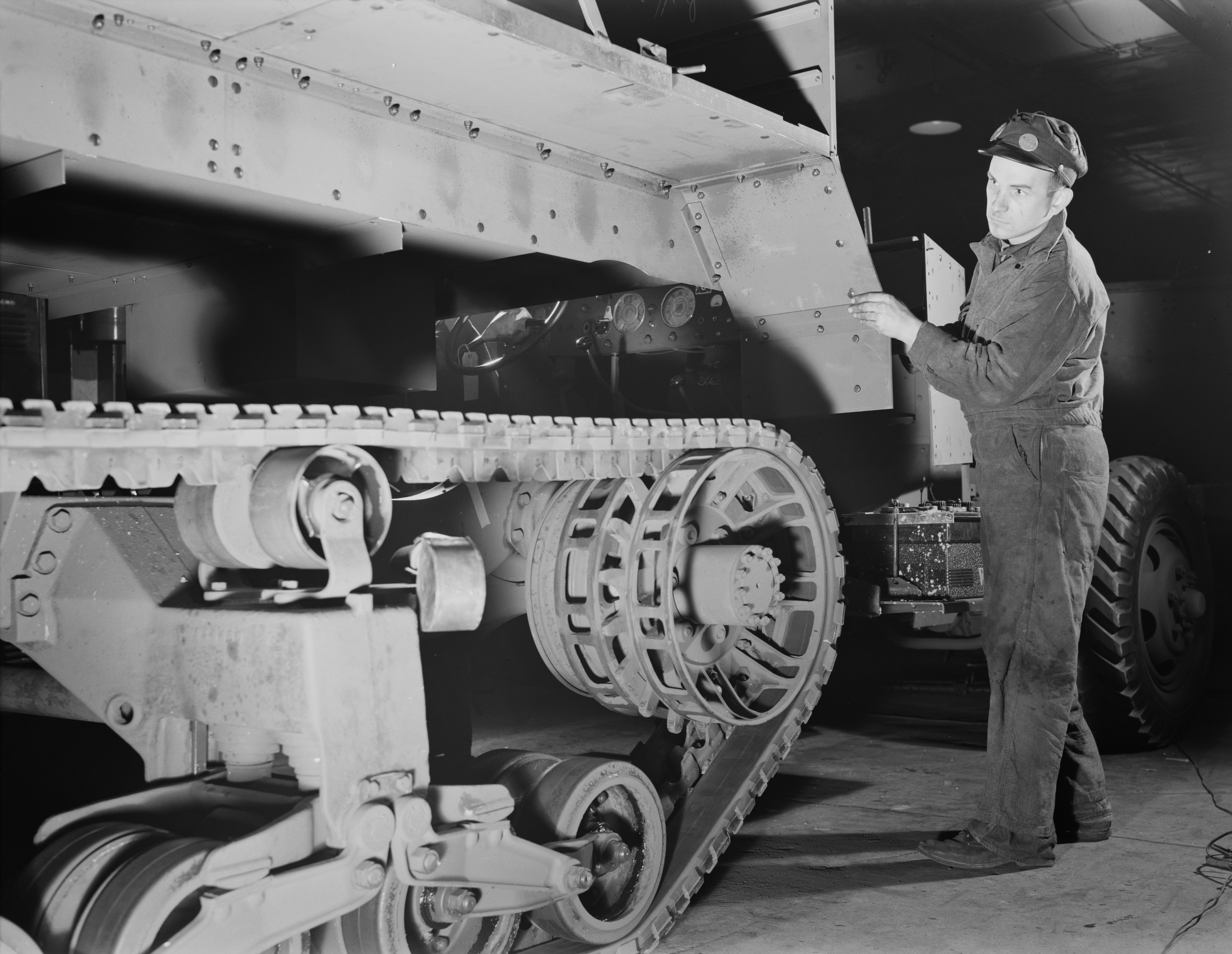
Pictured is the body of a scout car, manufactured by Diebold, being installed at a Diebold plant in Canton, Ohio in 1941.

Diebold was founded in 1859 in Cincinnati, Ohio as the Diebold Bahmann Safe Company. Under the leadership of founder Charles Diebold, a German immigrant, the company's 250 initial employees began manufacturing safes and bank vaults out of a factory in Canton, Ohio. Diebold states that 878 of its safes protected some of the only undamaged property in the Great Chicago Fire of 1871, and the following year Diebold moved its operations and headquarters to Canton to meet increased demand. In 1874, Diebold was contracted to build the world's largest safe, to be installed in the San Francisco branch of Wells Fargo. In 1876, after becoming incorporated in Ohio, the company changed its name to Diebold Safe & Lock Company. Diebold secured its first international sale in 1881, when it built a safe for the President of Mexico. Diebold debuted manganese steel doors marketed as TNT-proof in 1890, and in 1921, Diebold sold the world's largest commercial bank vault to Detroit National Bank. Diebold became a publicly traded company in the 1930s. Also around that time, Diebold introduced a "robbery-deterrent system for banks that flooded the bank lobby with tear gas" to help deal with robbers such as the infamous John Dillinger.

In 1936, Diebold expanded its product lines by acquiring companies specializing in products such as paper-based filing systems, and it began developing armor plate for military tanks that year. Between 1939 and 1945, Diebold devoted 98 percent of its activities to the war effort. Among other projects, during World War II Diebold employed around 2,900 workers and "sold $65 million in armor plate for more than 36,000 US Army scout cars," particularly the M3 scout car model. In 1943, Diebold Safe & Lock Company changed its name to Diebold, Incorporated, in an effort to reflect the company's increasing diversification of products. The prohibition agent Eliot Ness was on the Diebold board from 1944 until 1951, and in 1952 Raymond Koontz was named Diebold's president, after first joining Diebold as an assistant to the president in 1947. Diebold earned a net income of $1.7 million in 1959.

=== Computer security and ATMs (1960s-1990s) ===
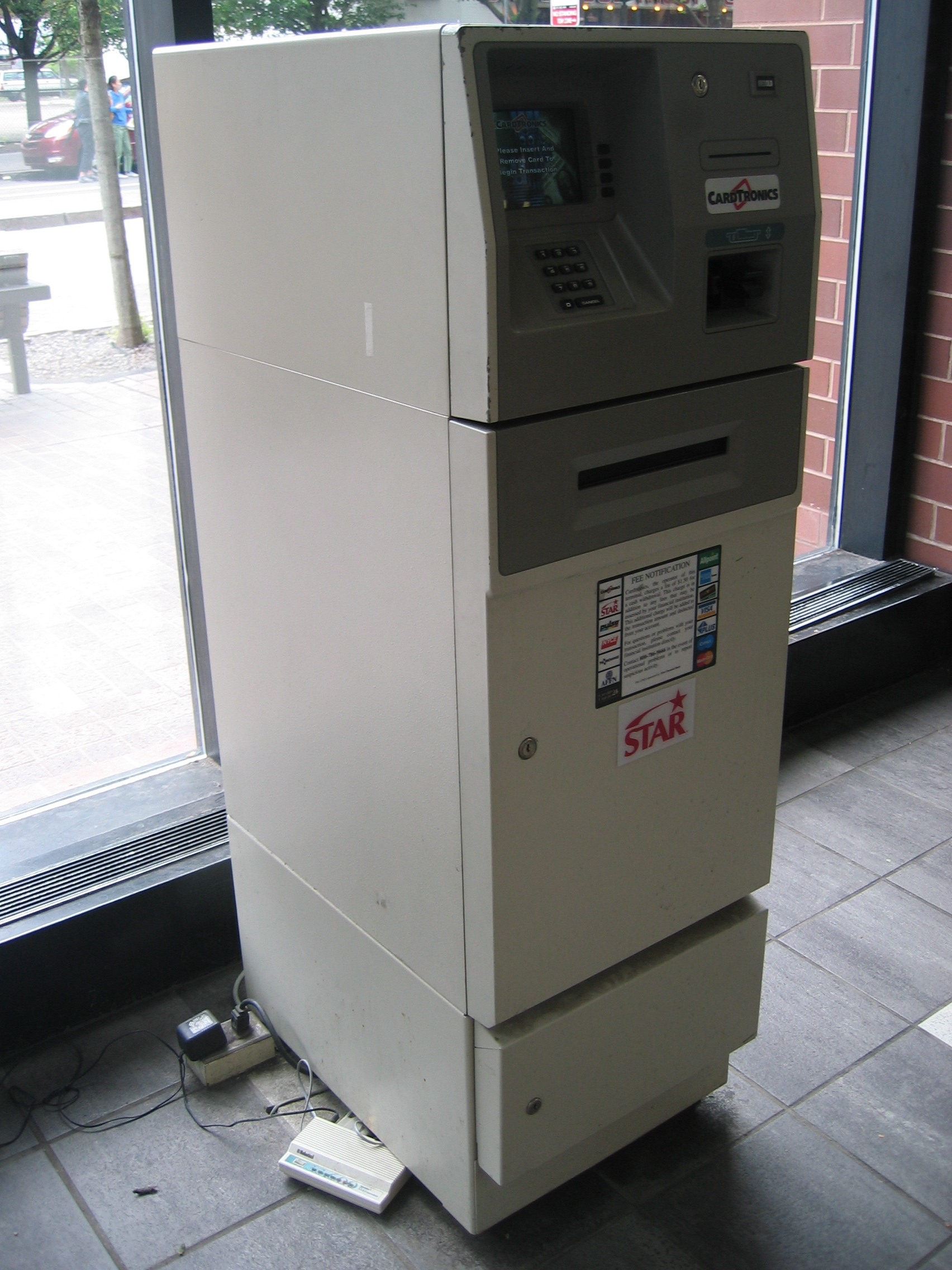
A Diebold 1063ix with a dial-up modem visible at the base

On April 27, 1964, Diebold went public on the New York Stock Exchange with the ticker symbol NYSE: DBD. In 1965 Diebold began offering pneumatic tube delivery systems to diverse institutions including banks and post offices. Still involved in safes and vaults, in 1968 the First National Bank of Chicago purchased the world's largest double vault doors from Diebold. Diebold subsequently began offering computer-controlled security and surveillance systems in 1970.

Between the early 1950s and the late 1970s, Diebold's annual revenue increased from US$229 million to $451 million. These results were in no small measure the consequence of the successful strategies by Diebold's president Raymond Koontz. In the early 1970s, Koontz began pushing the company into the then-emerging market for automated teller machines. This drive was evident as early as 1966, when Richard Glyer demonstrated a Diebold cash machine prototype at the annual meeting of the American Bankers Association in San Francisco, CA. Then in July 1970, Daniel Maggin, chairman of the board, accompanied Koontz to England with the specific purpose of meeting (without prior notice) with Chubb's Managing Director, William E. Randall. Diebold wanted exclusivity to distribute Chubb's cash machines throughout the USA.

The Chubb units, however, were found somewhat disappointing by the US market. After repeated failures and a limited availability of spare parts and service engineers, Diebold's staff and customers thought the Chubb devices did not meet their service expectations. Not surprisingly Diebold finally stopped distributing Chubb devices in 1973 and at the same time, decided to develop and eventually launch its own Total Automatic Banking System (TABS) 500. This device was developed by Robert W. Clark, Phillip C. Dolsen and Donald E. Kinker, and first installed in 1974.

Diebold's Event (alarm) Monitoring Center opened in 1985, allowing Diebold to monitor its "ATMs, kiosks, facilities and operations" full-time from a singular facility. Robert Mahoney was appointed company CEO in 1985. Koontz retired as chairman in 1988, although he continued to serve on the board. In 1989, Diebold shipped 12 percent of the world's ATMs sold worldwide. Diebold partnered with IBM on InterBold in 1990, a joint venture chiefly formed to provide self-service products for the financial industry. Under the terms of the joint venture, Diebold marketed their combined ATM lines in the US, while IBM marketed them abroad. By September 1995, Diebold was making over half of the ATMs used in the United States. In 1996, Diebold generated US$1 billion in revenue as a company for the first time in a single year. The InterBold partnership was dissolved on January 19, 1998, when Diebold purchased IBM's share of the partnership for $16.1 million.

=== International growth (1998-2001) ===
In the 1990s the company significantly diversified its products, and by 1998 was offering "automated teller machines, electronic and physical security equipment, automated medication dispensing systems, software, supplies and integrated systems solutions." Under Diebold chairman and CEO Robert Mahoney, Diebold debuted an ATM in 1999 that identified customers using iris recognition, which was the first of its kind. Also that year, Diebold introduced the first talking ATM in the United States. In October 1999, Diebold acquired all the stock of Procomp Amazonia Industria Electronica, S.A, a manufacturer of retail and banking automation equipment such as ATMs based in Sao Paulo, Brazil.

In 2001, Diebold acquired Mosler Safe Company in bankruptcy court and took over their operations, including securing the Charters of Freedom (the US Constitution, Bill of Rights, and Declaration of Independence) for the US National Archives in Washington, D.C. In February 2002, Diebold announced it would acquire the financial self-service assets of the European companies Getronics NV and Groupe Bull for approximately US$160 million. The agreement put Diebold near "$2 billion in revenue on an annualized basis." By the end of 2002, Diebold had 13,000 associates and serviced 88 countries. The company also continued to secure historical items such as the Hope Diamond at the Smithsonian Institution. Seeking to expand in India, at the end of 2002, Diebold announced a new production unit in Goa manufacturing ATMs in collaboration with Tata Infotech, and soon after announced a new corporate office in Mumbai. Revenue in 2003 was $2.1 billion for Diebold overall, with the stock up 36% for the year.

=== Diebold Election Systems and UTC (2002-2009) ===
In 2002, Diebold entered the United States elections industry through the acquisition of Global Election Systems, a producer of touch-screen voting technology based in McKinney, Texas. Branded Diebold Election Systems (DES), the acquisition was their smallest business segment, and in late 2002, 3.7 million voters in Georgia used DES touch-screen stations. DES was soon the subject of controversy amid allegations surrounding the security and reliability of some of its products, as well as the political fundraising activities of Diebold's then-CEO Walden O'Dell in 2003. Critics argued O'Dell had a political conflict of interest which could compromise the security of Diebold's ballots, which O'Dell denied. Shortly afterwards, Diebold forbade its top executives from making political donations. Citing personal reasons, O'Dell resigned in December 2005 after several consecutive quarters of poor performance, with his role taken by Tom Swidarski. In August 2007, DES rebranded itself as Premier Election Solutions, and two years later the division was sold to a competitor, Election Systems & Software.

Wired Magazine reported in 2007 that an editor using a Diebold IP address had removed negative information from the Diebold Wikipedia page, with the information later moved to a more appropriate location. Diebold was increasingly focusing on technology related to mobile banking as of 2008, incorporating mobile banking into many of its products. That year Diebold was selected to be the sole ATM provider at certain Beijing Olympics venues. In March 2008, United Technologies Corporation (UTC), a large engineering and defense conglomerate, announced it had made a $2.63 billion bid to buy Diebold, which was later rejected as too low. In October 2008, UTC announced it was breaking off acquisition talks after Diebold rejected the offer. The company had 17,000 workers worldwide by April 2009. In 2009 Bank Technology News ranked Diebold as No. 1 on its FINTECH 100 list of ATM providers.

=== New facilities and acquisitions (2010-2013) ===
After a lawsuit brought by the SEC alleging deceptive accounting between 2002 and 2007, several Diebold executives paid settlements in June 2010 to have the charges dropped, without admitting any liability. Other executives refused to settle. By 2011, Diebold was the largest manufacturer of ATMs in the United States. The company debuted a prototype of the first virtualized ATM that year, which was created jointly with VMware and used cloud technology. In 2011, Diebold was hired to implement "advanced security solutions" at the World Trade Center Transportation Hub. Also that year, SDM Magazine named Diebold its 2011 Systems Integrator of the Year. In 2012, Diebold debuted what it claims is the "world's first 4G LTE-enabled ATM concept," as well as "two-way concierge video services" to its ATMs. After acquiring around 4,400 ATMs from Toronto-Dominion Bank in 2012, in September 2012, Diebold acquired the Brazilian online banking company Gas Tecnologia, which protects around 70% of the internet banking transactions in Brazil. On October 25, 2012, the company announced it was suspending plans to build a new world headquarters in Green, Ohio, saying it was no longer economically feasible.

CEO and President Thomas Swidarski resigned in January 2013 after pressure from the board over poor financial performance. Henry D.G. Wallace, a former CFO for Ford Motor Company, assumed oversight of Diebold until a new CEO could be selected. Andy W. Mattes, a former Hewlett-Packard and Siemens executive, was appointed Diebold's new president and CEO in June 2013. Diebold debuted new ATM models in 2013, and also "increased its cash dividend for the 60th consecutive year." In 2013, Diebold was charged with violating the Foreign Corrupt Practices Act, after international division leaders and Diebold agents were alleged to have provided "improper gifts" to officials overseas. The Justice Department agreed to drop the charges if Diebold complied with various terms, including 18 months of compliance monitoring and a $48 million settlement.

=== Recent years and Wincor Nixdorf acquisition (2014-2017) ===
Diebold announced that it was buying the Danish PIN pad maker Cryptera in June 2014. Under the agreement, Cryptera remained a separate business operating under Diebold, and also remained an "original equipment manufacturer of EPP devices for Diebold and other existing customers." In July 2014, Diebold introduced its ActivEdge card reader, which it claims "prevents all known forms of skimming [ATM crime]." Diebold's revenue in 2014 equaled US$3.05 billion, an increase from the year before. Operating income equaled $117.0 million, net income equaled $114.4 million, and assets totaled $2.34 billion. As of 2014, Diebold held the record for consecutive dividend increases in its stock value.

In March 2015, Diebold acquired the Canadian ATM software company Phoenix Interactive Design. Based in London, Ontario, Phoenix was known for working with clients such as TD Canada Trust and Fifth Third Bank. Diebold sold the North American aspects of its electronic security business to Securitas in October 2015. Based in Stockholm, Securitas purchased the assets for US$350 million. On October 25, 2015, Diebold publicly debuted two new ATM concepts. The first model, Irving, allows customers to withdraw money with an iris scan instead of a card, while the second concept, titled Janus, was described by Fortune as "a dual-sided, self-service ATM that can serve two customers at the same time."

In June 2015, Diebold was reportedly in talks to acquire its German rival Wincor Nixdorf. with the new company to be named Diebold Nixdorf. On November 23, 2015, Diebold Incorporated and Wincor Nixdorf AG entered into a business combination agreement, with Diebold offering $1.8 billion in cash and shares to finance the acquisition. Combined, it was estimated that the two companies would control about 35 percent of the global ATM market. The combined company would have registered offices in North Canton, Ohio, and be operated from headquarters in North Canton and Wincor Nixdorf's facilities in Paderborn, Germany. Software development for the new company would take place in North America, with Diebold citing their Phoenix Interactive Design subdivision based in Ontario, Canada. Diebold announced it had satisfied the share tender condition to acquire Wincor Nixdorf on March 24, 2016. On August 15, 2016, it was announced that the acquisition had been completed, with Diebold Nixdorf beginning operations under the current name on August 16.

== Nixdorf history ==
Founded by Heinz Nixdorf, Nixdorf Computer was formed in 1952. In 1990, the company was purchased by Siemens and renamed Siemens Nixdorf Informationssysteme. The company was re-focused exclusively on its current product set in 1998 and renamed Siemens Nixdorf Retail and Banking Systems GmbH. Following a buyout by KKR and Goldman Sachs Alternatives on October 1, 1999, the company was renamed Wincor Nixdorf. The company was taken public on May 19, 2004, with a successful IPO. On November 8, 2006, chief executive officer Karl-Heinz Stiller announced his resignation from the board. Eckard Heidloff was elected as his replacement.

== Markets and services ==
Diebold Nixdorf markets its products and services in diverse financial, commercial, and retail industries. The company is split into three regional divisions including the Americas (including North America and Latin America), and the Asia Pacific. The Middle East, Europe, and Africa divisions operate as one segment.

Beyond designing and producing its own physical product lines, according to Bloomberg Diebold provides services involving "installation and ongoing maintenance of products, remote services, availability management, branch automation, and distribution channel consulting; and outsourced and managed services, such as remote monitoring, troubleshooting, transaction processing, currency management, maintenance services, and online communication services." The company also engages in project analysis for clients, as well as systems integration and architectural engineering.

== Products ==
Diebold Nixdorf is known for designing, manufacturing, and servicing numerous product lines related to automated service. By 1998, the company offered "automated teller machines, electronic and physical security equipment, automated medication dispensing systems, software, supplies, and integrated systems solutions," among other products and services.

=== Safes and metal work ===
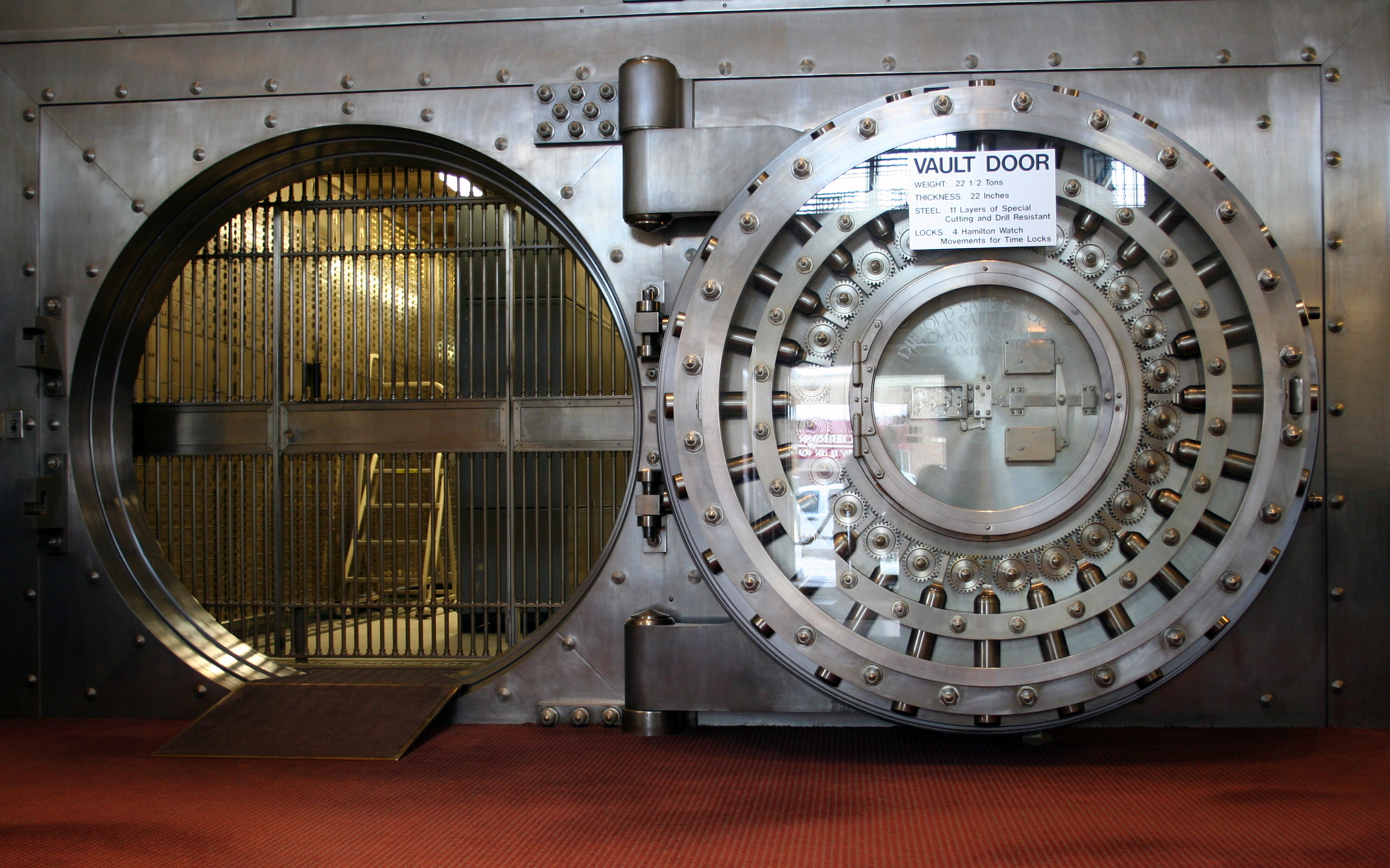
This large 24-bolt Diebold vault door at the Winona National Bank was built in the early 1900s.

Diebold was founded in 1859 as a manufacturer of safes and bank vaults, and bank safes and vaults would prove a staple of the company for many decades.

=== Automated dispensors ===
Over the years Diebold has developed many products involved with automated dispensation, for example automated teller machines, movie vending machines, airline ticket vending machines, and credit-card activated gas pumps. In 1965 Diebold began "offering pneumatic tube delivery systems to banks, hospitals, post offices, libraries, office buildings" and many other industrial facilities. In the mid-1990s Diebold created its MedSelect Systems division, which introduced an automated drug dispensing system in 1995.

=== Security measures ===
Diebold has developed a number of physical and electronic security products, and in recent years has been contracted to protect the World Trade Center Transportation Hub, the Hope Diamond at the Smithsonian Institution, and the United States Constitution, among other notable artifacts and landmarks. The company no longer engages in specialized physical security projects, and has since sold its North America-based electronic security business in October 2015.

For ATM security, Diebold introduced its ActivEdge card reader in 2014, which it describes as "the industry's first complete anti-skimming card reader prevents all known forms of skimming – the most prevalent type of ATM crime – as well as other forms of ATM fraud."

=== Automated teller machines ===
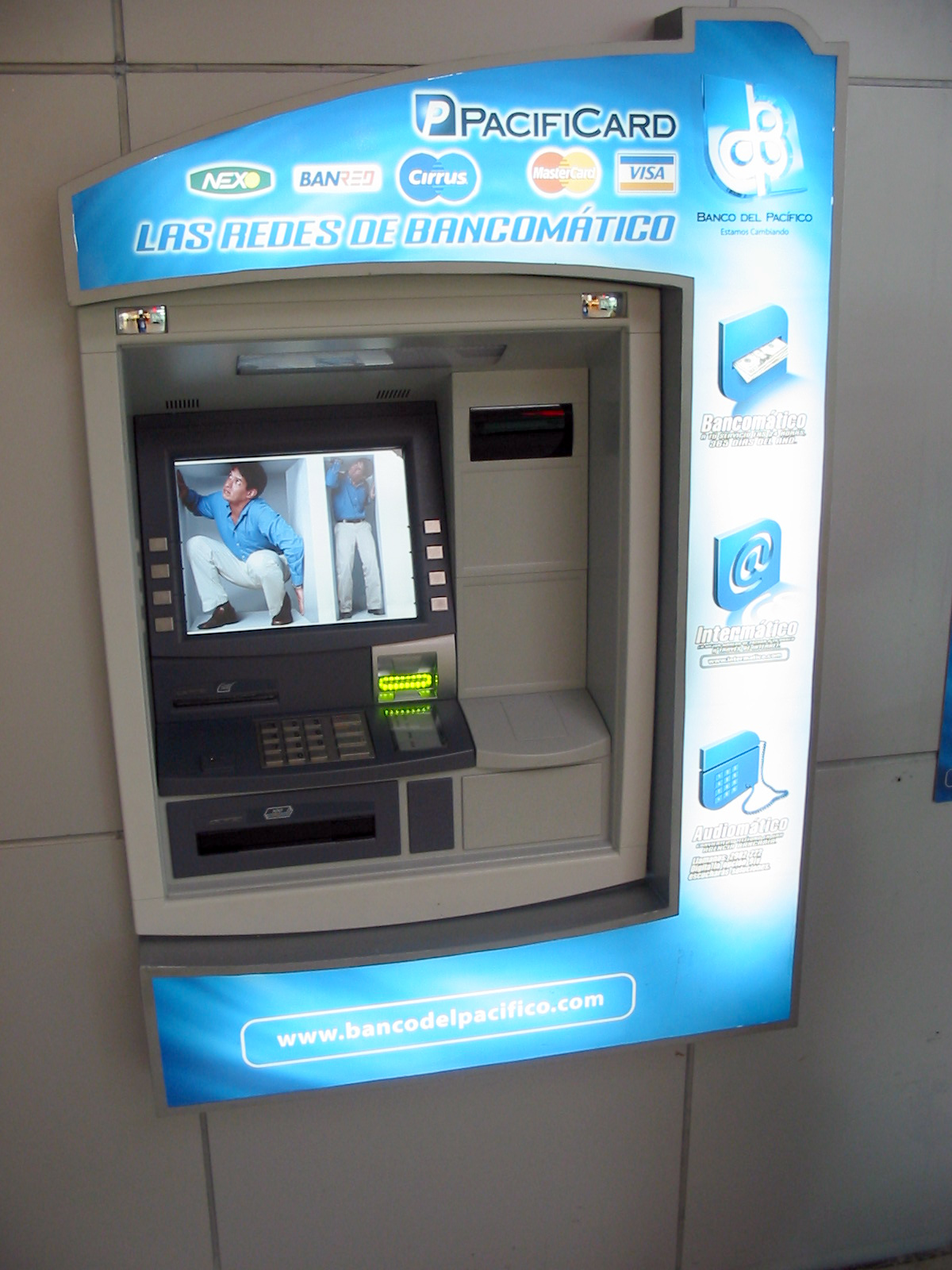
2006 image of the Diebold Opteva 760 ATM

Diebold branched into the emerging market for automated teller machines (ATMs) in the early 1970s, and has since debuted numerous ATM product lines. Diebold's Total Automatic Banking System 500 (TABS 500) product was revealed in 1972. Another early ATM created by Diebold was the Diebold 10xx, introduced in 1985 as part of the 10xx series. InterBold, the ATM sales and marketing arm of Diebold, introduced many ATMs in the early 1990s. In 1999, Diebold debuted an ATM that identified customers using iris recognition, which was the first of its kind. Diebold also introduced the first talking ATM in the United States that year, which was installed on October 1, 1999, in San Francisco's City Hall.

In July 2002 Diebold introduced its 3030 Bulk Cash Recycler Model (BCRM), and in 2003, Diebold launched its Opteva line of ATMs.

On December 8, 2014, Diebold debuted the 3500 and 3700 ATM series, both of which handle cash recycling among other functions. On October 25, 2015, Diebold publicly debuted two new ATM concepts at the Las Vegas Money20/20 show. The first model Irving, which was undergoing testing by Citigroup at the time, allows customers to withdraw money with an iris scan, removing the need for a card. The second ATM concept, titled Janus, was described by Fortune as a "dual-sided, self-service ATM that can serve two customers at the same time," with videoconferencing also available for help with complex transactions.

== Diebold Foundation ==
The philanthropic arm of Diebold, Inc., The Diebold Foundation, has supported several non-profits, including local branches of Meals on Wheels, as well as the Group Plan Commission to support the redevelopment of Cleveland's Public Square.

== See also ==
- Membership of ATM Industry Association (ATMIA)
- Companies listed on the New York Stock Exchange (D)
- List of companies of the United States by state
- List of S&P 400 companies
- Premier Election Solutions (formerly Diebold Election Systems)
- Economy of Ohio

== Diebold's association with wikipedia ==
On November 17th, 2005 an anonymous user working from a Diebold IP address deleted important paragraphs on the wikipedia page for Diebold specifically 15 full paragraphs from the article, or more specifically the entire controversies article from the page. This was after 2003 in which the company wrote a republican fundraising letter to former president George W. Bush about oil which damaged the company's claim of neutrality. Scientist's for the company demonstrated that the company machines had many security vulnerability's including that they would be able to be hacked via a simple memory card.
