= Norbert Ryska =

German mathematician and museum director

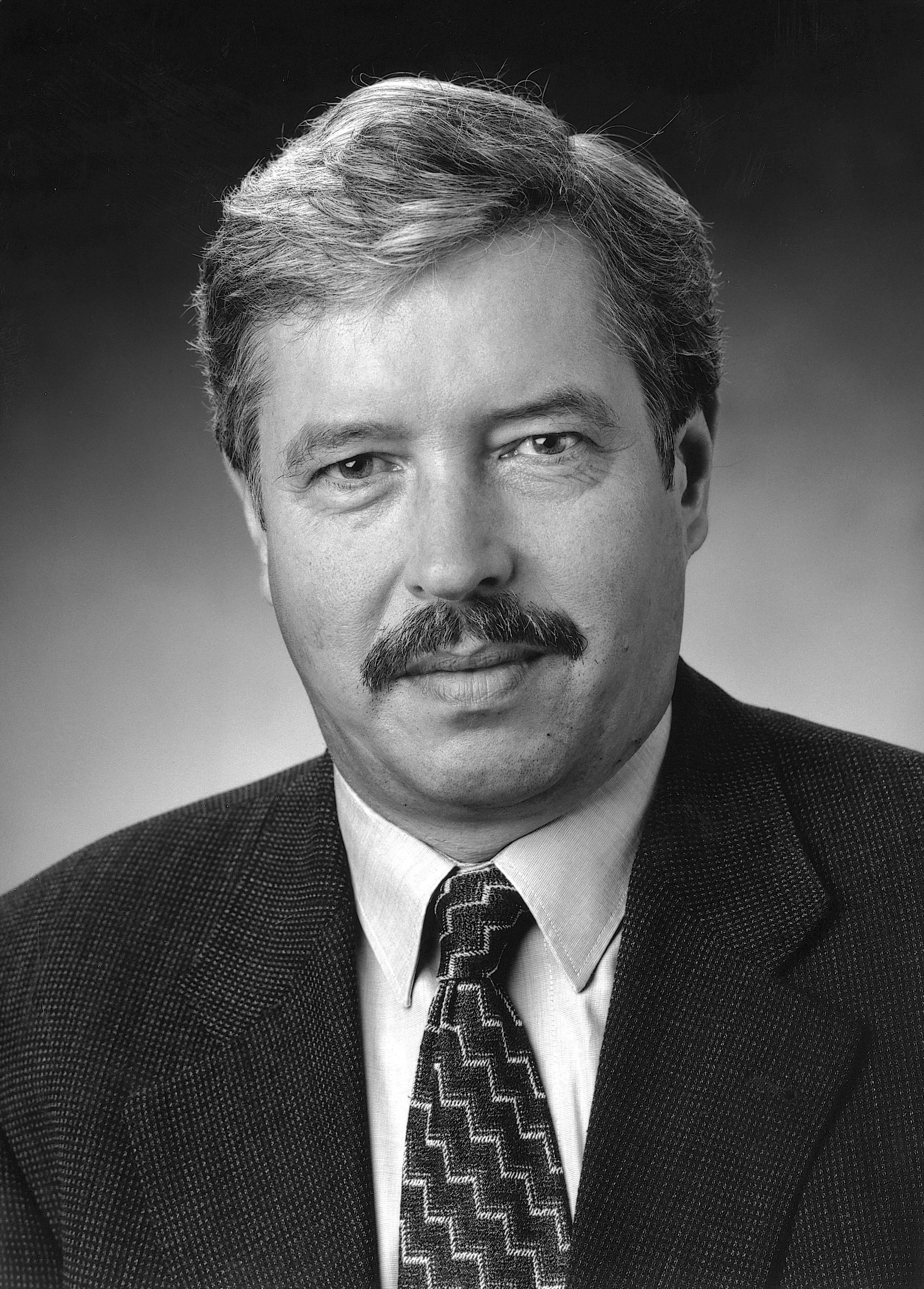
- Norbert Ryska 1998
- Born: August 9, 1948 (age 77); Hau on the Lower Rhine, Germany

Norbert Ryska (born August 9, 1948, in Hau) is a German mathematician and museum director. Ryska worked from 1976 to 1992 as an employee of Nixdorf Computer AG in the R&D department. Until 1996 as managing director and project manager on behalf of the Nixdorf Foundations mainly responsible for the construction of the Heinz Nixdorf MuseumsForum (HNF). From 1996 to 2013, Ryska was the managing director for the museum and technology departments of the HNF.

== Early life ==
Ryska was born in Hau on the Lower Rhine in 1948, the son of the technician and operating engineer Ferdinand Ryska. He attended high school in Kleve. After graduating from high school in 1967, he completed his military service, e.g. in the communications center of the 1st Corps of the German Armed Forces in Münster where he learned how to use encryption technology. In the winter semester of 1968/69, Ryska studied English and Romance languages in Münster and from the summer of 1969 he continued his studies in philology for three further terms at Bonn University. From the winter semester of 1970/71 he studied mathematics and computer science. The mathematician Friedrich Hirzebruch was one of his professors. In the summer of 1976, Ryska received a diploma in mathematics. During his studies he had part-time jobs for Inter Nationes, the German Bundestag and the Reuters news agency.

On November 1, 1976, Ryska joined Nixdorf Computer AG (NCAG) in Paderborn. His most important work in the years that followed was a security system for ATMs. He was then responsible for the coordination of national and European funding projects in the NCAG Research and Development department and was responsible for public relations.

After the merger of NCAG with the data and information technology division of Siemens AG to form Siemens Nixdorf Informationssysteme AG (SNI) on October 1, 1990, Ryska continued to oversee funding projects at the SNI. From April 1, 1992, he worked on the project of a computer museum. The Westphalia Foundation, founded by Heinz Nixdorf, appointed Norbert Ryska to the project team for a computer museum in 1992. On April 1, 1993, he became managing director of the non-profit Forum für Informationstechnik GmbH.

With the exhibition designer Ludwig Thürmer and the architect Gerhard Diel, Ryska completed the transformation of the NCAG headquarters into the Heinz Nixdorf MuseumsForum. He led the team that selected exhibits and created texts, images and films. When it opened on October 24, 1996, he was one of the two managing directors alongside Theodor Rode and was responsible for the permanent exhibition, the media department and technical staff. From 1997 to 2017, his co-managing director Kurt Beiersdörfer was responsible for marketing, events and museum education as well as for several special exhibitions.

Together with Wolfgang Back (WDR), Ryska realized three WDR computer nights at the HNF in 1998, 1999 and 2001. In 2001, Ryska created a section on the history of cryptology; in 2004 he created a cryptology archive. In 2002 he initiated the multimedia presentation “Wall of Fame”, which was finished in 2004. In the same year, Ryska was able to convince the Nixdorf Foundation Board for his concept of an extensive expansion and update of the permanent exhibition to acquire and implement the areas of "Interfaces-Kommunikation mit der Maschine" ("interface communication with the machine"), "Künstliche Intelligenz und Robotik" ("artificial intelligence and robotics"), "Mobile Kommunikation" ("mobile communication"), "Digitale Welt" ("digital world"), "Showroom – Technik von morgen" ("showroom – technology of tomorrow"). In 2007, Ryska and the HNF participated in the Bletchley Park Computer Museum's Cipher Event. In the same year he created an exhibition on software and computer science. Between 2008 and 2012 he organized “Zahlen, bitte!” (“numbers/pay, please!”) a special exhibition on mathematics, “Codes und Clowns” (“Codes and Clowns”) on Claude Shannon and “Genial & Geheim” ("Ingenious & Secret") on Alan Turing. August 30, 2013 was Ryska's last day at HNF. He then engaged in private historical research.

== Founding initiator and promoter of the computer museum HNF ==
The founding process of the development of a "computer museum" initiated by the Nixdorf Foundations (1992), which was to include the collection and product history of Nixdorf Computer AG (1992–1996), was moderated to a large extent by Ryska. In cooperation and consultation with more than 100 national and international experts (from science, technology, education, design and politics, including Rolf Oberliesen), he tried to combine the development and design of a museum with a public forum, for which previously there have been no models worldwide in relation to existing modern technology or company museums.

He took on the task of combining the design and implementation of this still vague founding idea for a museum, consisting of existing technical artefacts (special information and communication technology collections) with an open forum. He led a difficult conceptual coordination process between previous company interests and public ideas and social demands. With a group of interior architects, designers and multimedia programmers, he succeeded in connecting a technology museum and a forum in the design of 60 identified exhibition areas.

Together with Ludwig Thürmer and Gerhard Diel, a coherent concept for these presentations in the building of the former Nixdorf headquarters in Paderborn was developed. Right from the start, the focus was on a specific conceptual openness of the museum as a background for further specialist exploration and current issues of the forum.

An open, non-linear presentation concept was realized that presented both the before and after one another as well as the simultaneity in concrete historical and social contexts of technological development, also as a basis for further current questions in an interdisciplinary public forum. Here, in a “spatial dramaturgy”, a “experiential museum” was created with “contemporary surroundings” perspectively integrated via “time stations” and a “cultural-historical panorama wall”. This also appeared as a specific contribution to a socially and ecologically compatible design of technology within the framework of public technology policy dialogues about the future of industrial societies. The presentations, designed over two floors, met a recognized level of high quality standards in terms of content and functionality.

Even before the opening of the MuseumsForum by then Federal Chancellor Helmut Kohl on October 24, 1996, the previous sponsoring company of the Westphalia Foundation renamed the computer museum to "HNF Heinz Nixdorf MuseumsForum GmbH" (1995), also as a consistent confirmation of Ryska's pursued interdisciplinary integration concept of technology presence and forum designed for dialogue. Ryska was appointed managing director of the HNF (1996–2013), where he was able to decisively advance the previous development concept and expand the subject areas.

== Publications ==
- Kryptographische Verfahren in der Datenverarbeitung. Springer-Verlag, Berlin 1980, co-written with Siegfried Herda ISBN 978-3-540-09900-0.
- Nixdorf Technologie-Broschüren für CeBIT. Self-publishing, Paderborn 1981–1989.
- PapierKunst – 365 × im HNF: Objekte von Dorothea Reese-Heim. W.V. Westfalia Druck GmbH, Paderborn 2002, ISBN 978-3-9805757-3-7.
- Heinz Nixdorf. Lebensbilder 1925 – 1986. Merkur Druck, Detmold 2007, co-written with Margret Schwarte-Amedick.
- Kurze Geschichte der Informatik, Friedrich L. Bauer (mit redaktioneller Unterstützung von Norbert Ryska). Wilhelm Fink Verlag, München 2007, 2. Auflage: Wilhelm Fink Verlag, München 2009, ISBN 978-3-7705-4379-3
- Origins and Foundations of Computinig, Friedrich L. Bauer (with editorial assistance by Norbert Ryska). Springer Verlag, München 2010, ISBN 978-3-642-02992-9.
- Weltgeschichte der Kryptologie. Data CD of the HNF Heinz Nixdorf Museumsforum, Paderborn 2015.

== Other publications ==
- Norbert Ryska: Möglichkeiten der Datenverschlüsselung bei Geldausgabe-Automaten: Hast du was – weißt du was – kriegst du was. Newspaper article Computerwoche, 31. Oktober 1980.
- Norbert Ryska, Jochen Viehoff: Codes und Clowns. Claude Shannon – Jongleur der Wissenschaft. Zeitschrift Mitteilungen der Deutschen Mathematiker-Vereinigung (MDMV) 17, pp. 236–238, 2009.
- Norbert Ryska: Kalender für das Klever Land auf das Jahr 2011. Geschichte: "Berühmter Rechenmaschinenerfinder stammte aus Kleve" – Johann Helfrich von Müller. Boss-Verlag, Kleve 2010, ISBN 978-3-89413-011-4
- William Aspray, Len Shustek, Norbert Ryska: Computer museum series – Great computing museums of the world, part one. Communications of the ACM (CACM) 53(1): pp. 43–46, 2010.
- Rainer Glaschick, Norbert Ryska: Alan Turing und Deutschland: Berührungspunkte. Informatik Spektrum 35(4): pp. 295–300, 2012.
- Norbert Ryska, Jochen Viehoff: The Heinz Nixdorf Museums Forum, Central Venue for the "History of Computing". HC, London 2013: pp. 47–52.
- Norbert Ryska: Kalender für das Klever Land auf das Jahr 2021. Story: "Knickebein-Leitstrahlen für die Luftschlacht um England kamen aus Kleve". Aschendorff Verlag, Münster 2020, ISBN 978-3-402-22436-6.

== External links section ==
- Nixdorf Stiftungen: Heinz Nixdorf Stiftung und Stiftung Westfalen
- Heinz Nixdorf MuseumsForum
