= Edos =

Computer operating system

- Developer: The Computer Software Company
- OS family: DOS/360 and successors
- Working state: Historic, unsupported
- Initial release: 1972; 53 years ago
- Available in: English
- Package manager: N/A
- Default user interface: Command-line interface
- License: Proprietary

Edos is a discontinued operating system based upon IBM's mainframe DOS/360. The name stands for extended (or enhanced) disk operating system. It was later purchased by the West German computer company Nixdorf, who renamed it to NIDOS (Nixdorf Disk Operating System).

In 1970, IBM announced the IBM/370 product line along with new peripherals, software products, and operating systems, including DOS/VS that supplanted the DOS/360 line. Although IBM was rightly focused on their new products, the computing world was dominated by the IBM/360 line, which left a lot of users nervous about their investment.

Although there were a couple of projects emulating the IBM/370 on the IBM/360 (e.g., CFS, Inc.), other companies took a different approach, extending the then-current (and limited) DOS.

The Computer Software Company (TCSC) took the latter approach. Starting in 1972, they developed Edos, Extended Disk Operating System. They extended the number of fixed program space partitions from 3 to 6, added support for new hardware, and included features that IBM had offered separately. The first version of Edos was released in 1972, in response to the announcement by IBM that DOS Release 26 was the last DOS release to be supported on the System 360, and future DOS Releases would support System 370 machines only.

They also made available other third party enhancements such as a spooler and DOCS, from CFS, Inc.

== Edos/VS and Edos/VSE ==
TCSC enhanced EDOS to become EDOS/VS, which was announced in 1977 and delivered it to beta test sites in 1978. In May 1977, TCSC announced it would release Edos/VS in response to IBM's release of DOS/VS Release 34 and Advanced Functions-DOS/VS. Edos/VS was based on IBM's DOS/VS Release 34, and provided equivalent functionality to IBM's Advanced Functions-DOS/VS product. Unlike IBM's offerings, Edos/VS would run on System 360 machines and System 370 machines lacking virtual storage hardware (non-VS machines), whereas IBM's offerings only supported the latest System 370 models with VS hardware included. TCSC identified the parts of IBM's DOS/VS Release 34 operating system which relied upon System/370-only machine instructions and rewrote them to use instructions supported by the System/360. TCSC was legally able to reuse IBM's DOS/VS Release 34 code, since IBM had (intentionally) published the code without a copyright notice, which made it public domain under US copyright law at the time.

In 1981, NCSC announced plans to release an Edos/VSE 2.0, based on IBM DOS/VSE Release 35, suitable for IBM 4300 machines.

== TCSC corporate history ==
TCSC was founded by Jerry Enfield and Tom Steel, responsible for development and marketing, respectively. Company headquarters were in Richmond, Virginia. TCSC expanded into Canada, Australia, and Europe. Other products of TCSC included the Extended Console (Econ) system, which enabled display of the system console using a CRT terminal such as an IBM 3270. Econ was available for IBM's DOS and DOS/VS and TCSC's Edos and Edos/VS operating systems.

In 1980, the company was acquired by Nixdorf and became NCSC. By 1982, Nixdorf had renamed Edos to NIDOS/VSE, and was selling to run on their new Nixdorf 8890 series of IBM-compatible mainframes.

TCSC licensed DATACOM/DB from Applied Data Research (ADR) to run under its EDos and EDos/VS operating systems. When in 1980 Nixdorf bought TCSC, Nixdorf sought to continue the licensing arrangement; ADR and NCSC went to court in a dispute over whether the licensing arrangement was terminated by the acquisition. ADR and Nixdorf settled out of court in 1981, with an agreement that Nixdorf could continue to resell ADR's products.

In July 1985, Nixdorf announced the release of Nidos/VSE Release 2.

== Add-on products for Edos ==
In 1973, TCSC released a remote job entry (RJE) option for Edos.

In 1975, TCSC released a tape management system for Edos known as TMS.

In 1983, NCSC announced a Unix compatibility subsystem for IBM mainframes running IBM's DOS/VS(E) and Nixdorf's Edos/VS and Edos/VSE operating systems, known as Programmer Work Station/VSE-Advanced Functions, or PWS/VSE-AF for short. PWS/VSE-AF was based on the Coherent Unix clone developed by Mark Williams Company.

== Discontinuation ==
In 1989, Nixdorf decided to pull out of the IBM-compatible mainframe market, in order to focus on Unix. It transferred its Nixdorf 8890 line of clone IBM mainframes to Comparex Informationssysteme GmbH. However, while Comparex was willing to take over the hardware business, it did not want the responsibility of maintaining the Edos operating system, preferring instead that its customers purchase DOS/VSE or MVS from IBM. Nixdorf decided to cancel all work on the next release of Edos, since they did not want to commit to maintain any new version in the years to come.
