= DOCS (software) =

DOCS (Display Operator Console Support) was a software package for IBM mainframes by CFS Inc., enabling access to the system console using 3270-compatible terminals.

Computer operators communicated with IBM mainframe computers using an electro-mechanical typewriter-like console that came standard on most IBM 360 and 370 computer, except a few upper end models that offered video consoles and the Model 20 which came standard without a console.

The majority of smaller and less expensive IBM 360s and 370s came equipped with these ruggedized Selectric keyboard devices. The Selectric was a major step up from the teletypes (TTY) associated with Unix and smaller systems, but still clunky. The video consoles provided with certain models were not considered particularly user friendly, and they ignored two thirds of IBM's mainframe market, DOS and its VSE descendants.

DOCS replaced or supplanted the typewriter interface with a video screen. In practice, it worked a little like present-day instant messenger programs (ICQ, QQ, AIM, Adium, iChat, etc.), with a data entry line at the bottom and messages scrolling in real time up the screen. The commands were otherwise identical.

DOCS was available for DOS, DOS/VS, DOS/VSE, and came packaged with third-party operating systems, such as EDOS from The Computer Software Company, later acquired by Nixdorf.

== Platforms ==
=== Software ===
The product ran under platforms:

- DOS/VS
- DOS/VSE
- EDOS
- vDOS

=== Hardware ===
Several vendors offered DOCS as part of their OS:

- Amdahl
- Fujitsu
- Hitachi
- Magnuson
- RCA

== Development ==
DOCS was developed by CFS, Inc. of Brookline, Massachusetts at the Kayser-Roth data center in Whitman, Massachusetts. Dick Goran wrote the video interface. Leigh Lundin wrote the operating system interface and transcript recorder.

=== Fx ===
DOCS required a dedicated partition. With DOS having only three partitions and DOS/VS seven, giving up a partition to DOCS placed a crimp in practicability.

Leigh Lundin designed Fx, a pseudo-partition that relieved the user from relinquishing a working partition. Fx appeared in the DOS/VS version of SDI's Grasp as F0.

== Marketing ==
DOCS was sold in North America by CFS, Inc, Brookline, Ma.

For overseas sales, CFS engaged in both mail order and local vendors. The product was also embedded in third party operating system packages, such as EDOS and vDOS.
