= Coherent (operating system) =

Unix operating system clone

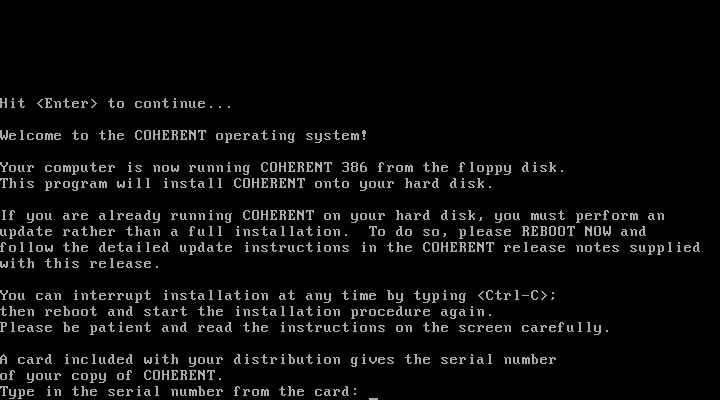
- Coherent 4.2.10 installer
- Developer: Mark Williams Company
- OS family: Unix-like
- Working state: Discontinued
- Source model: Closed source; open sourced in 2015
- Initial release: 1980; 45 years ago
- Latest release: 4.2.14 / 1994; 31 years ago
- Available in: English
- Supported platforms: PDP-11, x86 (8088, 286, 386, 486), Motorola 68000, Zilog Z8000
- Kernel type: Monolithic
- Default user interface: Command-line (KornShell)
- License: 2015: BSD-3-Clause; Original: Proprietary

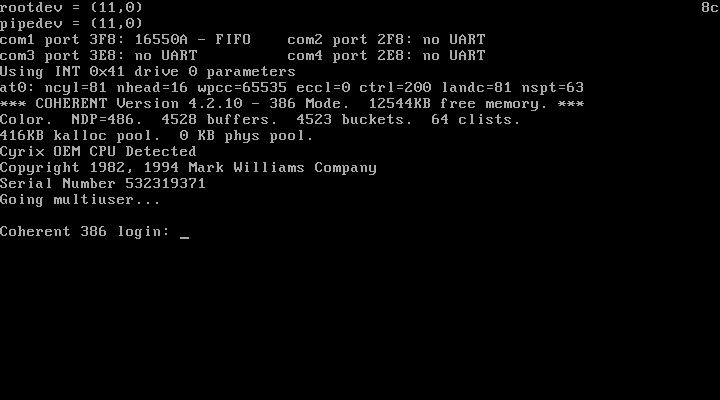
Coherent system startup and login prompt

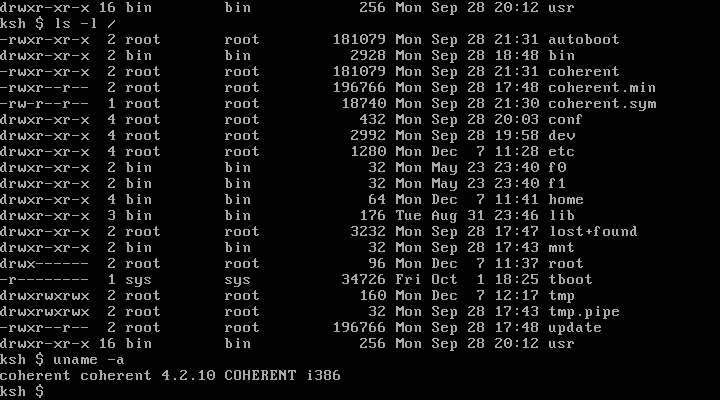
Viewing the root directory and system information

Coherent is a clone of the Unix operating system for IBM PC compatibles and other microcomputers, developed and sold by the now-defunct Mark Williams Company (MWC). Historically, the operating system was a proprietary product, but it became open source in 2015, released under the BSD-3-Clause license.

== Development ==
Coherent was not Unix; the Mark Williams Company had no rights to either the Unix trademark or the AT&T/Bell Labs source code. In the early years of its existence, MWC received a visit from an AT&T delegation looking to determine whether MWC was infringing on AT&T Unix property. The delegation included Dennis Ritchie, who concluded that "it was very hard to believe that Coherent and its basic applications were not created without considerable study of the OS code and details of its applications." However, he also stated that:

[...] looking at various corners [for peculiarities, bugs, etc. that I knew about in the Unix distributions of the time] I couldn't find anything that was copied. It might have been that some parts were written with [AT&T] source nearby, but at least the effort had been made to rewrite. If it came to it, I could never honestly testify [...] that what they generated was irreproducible from the manual.

Much of the operating system was written by alumni from the University of Waterloo: Tom Duff, Dave Conroy, Randall Howard, Johann George, and Trevor John Thompson. Significant contributions were also made by people such as Nigel Bree (from Auckland, New Zealand), the later author of Ghost.

== Versions ==
Coherent was originally written for the PDP-11 range of minicomputers in 1980, then ported to various early 1980s microcomputer systems including IBM PC compatibles and machines based on the Zilog Z8000 and Motorola 68000. Initially sold to OEMs, starting 1983 it was available on the consumer market from MWC directly. At this point, Coherent 2.3 offered roughly the functionality of Version 7 Unix on PC hardware, including the nroff formatter but not the BSD extensions offered by competing Unix/clone vendors; compared to its competitors, it was a small system distributed on only seven double-sided floppy disks, costing only US$500 for a license.

Coherent runs on most Intel-based PCs with Intel 8088, 286, 386, and 486 processors. Coherent version 3 for Intel-based PCs requires at least a 286; Coherent version 4 for Intel-based PCs requires at least a 386. Like a true Unix, Coherent is able to multitask and support multiple users. From version 4, released 1992, Coherent also has support for X11 and MGR windowing systems.

Later versions of Coherent (version 4 and higher) support features common in modern Unix-like systems, including a version of MicroEMACS, access to FAT16 file systems, an optimizing C compiler, and a modified version of Taylor UUCP. The final releases of Coherent also fully support the iBCS COFF binary standard, which allow binary compatibility with SCO Unix applications, including WordPerfect, Lotus 1-2-3, and several Microsoft applications including QuickBASIC, Microsoft Word, and MultiPlan. The last 386 versions supported virtual memory, but not demand paging.

A Zilog Z8000 port of Coherent was also used by the canceled Commodore 900 system.

In 1983, NCSC (a subsidiary of Nixdorf) announced a port of Coherent to IBM mainframes, in the form of a Unix compatibility subsystem for IBM's DOS/VS and DOS/VSE and Nixdorf's Edos/VS and Edos/VSE operating systems, known as Programmer Work Station/VSE-Advanced Functions, or PWS/VSE-AF for short.

The Mark Williams Company closed in 1995.

On January 3, 2015, Coherent sources were released under the BSD-3-Clause license.

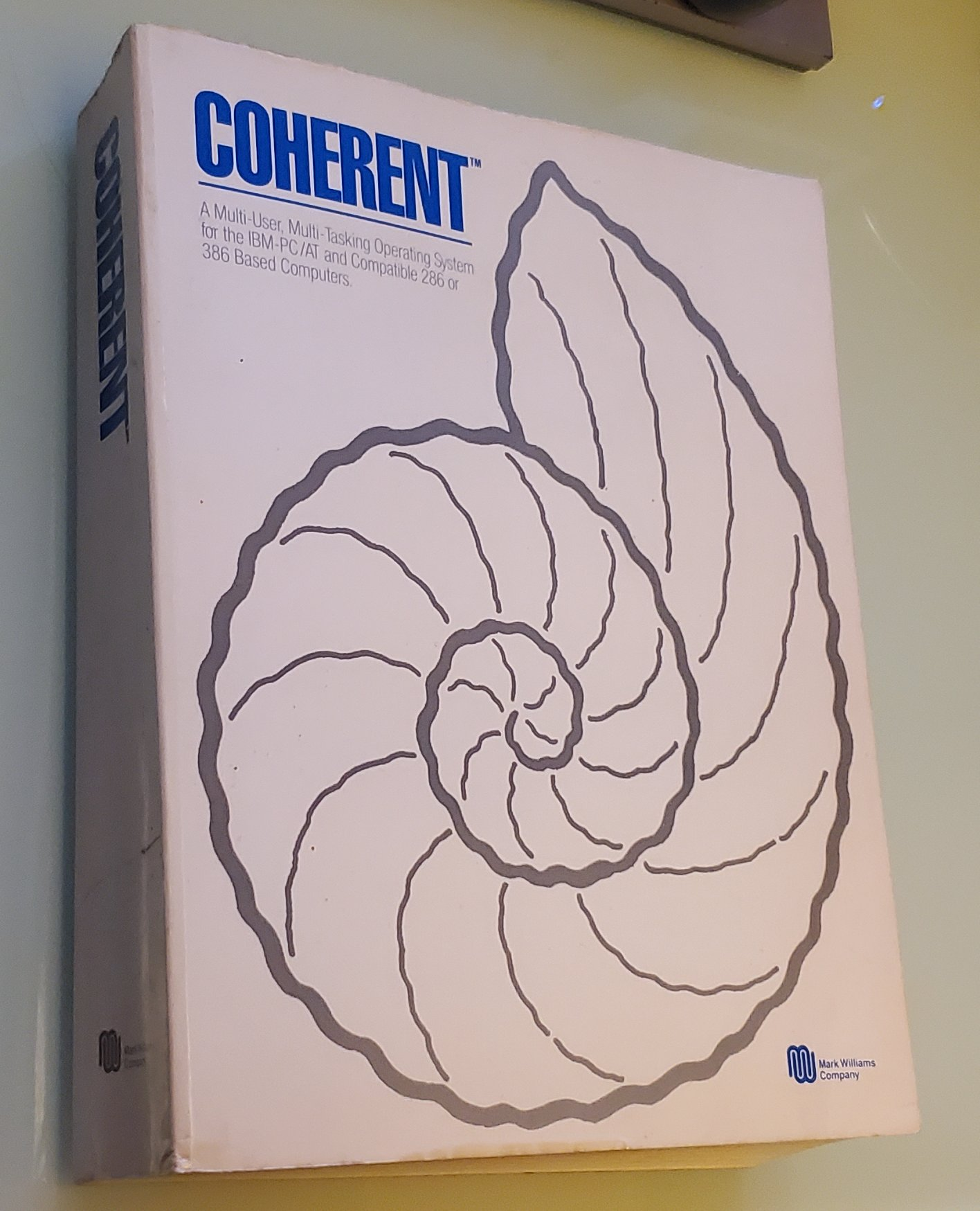

== Reception ==
BYTE in 1984 called Coherent a "highly compatible UNIX Version 7 lookalike". In 1985 it criticized the difficulty of installation, but stated that "as a UNIX clone, Coherent is amazingly complete ... it should be easy to port programs ... the price of $495 is a bargain".

Coherent "is not without drawbacks", UnixWorld in 1985 said, but favorably cited its low hardware requirement, "only $500" cost, and clear documentation. The magazine found that Coherent was "surprisingly complete for a rewrite", with good interactive and multiuser performance, and estimated that up to eight tasks could be run while remaining usable. While noting the inability to run the AIM Multiuser Benchmark, and lack of certain utilities such as csh and SCCS, UnixWorld concluded that "Coherent is still a good choice for the IBM PC/XT owner who wants a Unix-compatible operating system at a very reasonable cost and low system hardware overhead".

Early 1990s reviews of Coherent pointed out that the system was much smaller than other contemporary Unix offerings, as well as less expensive at US$99.95, but lacking in functionality and software support. PC Magazine called Coherent 3.0 a "time capsule" that captured the state of Unix in the late 1970s, without support for mice, LANs or SCSI disks, good for learning basic Unix programming but not for business automation. A review in the AUUG's newsletter was more positive, favorably comparing Coherent to MKS Toolkit, Minix and Xenix, and suggesting it might fill a niche as a low-end training platform.

== See also ==
- PC/IX
- Venix
