= Marianne Thomann-Stahl =

Marianne Thomann-Stahl (born March 23, 1954, in Oberkochen) is a German politician (FDP). She was Regierungspräsidentin of the Regierungsbezirk Detmold from 2005 to 2019 and briefly in 2022.

== Education and profession ==
After Volksschule, Thomann-Stahl completed her Abitur at a Gymnasium in 1973 and then studied Economics in Freiburg im Breisgau until 1978. Economics, graduating with a degree in Diplom economics. From 1978 to 1980, she was Managing Director (Germany) and Federal Chairwoman of the international student organization AIESEC. From 1980, she worked as an assistant to the board of Nixdorf Computer AG and subsequently in leading positions in industry until 1996.

== Politics ==
Marianne Thomann-Stahl has been a member of the FDP since 1973 and has been active within the party, including as chairwoman of the working group "Future Financing of Infrastructure" in the Federal Committee "Transport" and as chairwoman of the State Committee "Urban Development, Housing, State Planning and Transport".

From May 30, 1985, to May 31, 1995, and again from June 2, 2000, to July 27, 2005, Thomann-Stahl was a member of the Landtag Nordrhein-Westfalen. She was elected to the state parliament via the state list of the FDP and initially served as transport and social policy spokesperson, from 1990 to 1995 as deputy chairwoman of the FDP state parliamentary group and from 2000 to 2005 as its parliamentary manager.

After Thomann-Stahl was appointed parliamentary manager by the Minister of the Interior on 22 July 2005, she was elected to the state parliament. After Thomann-Stahl was appointed Minister of the Interior of the newly formed CDU/FDP State Government on July 22, 2005, she resigned her seat in the state parliament on July 27, 2005.

On December 2, 2019, she retired from her post as District President of the Detmold District. Judith Pirscher was appointed as her successor.

In March 2022, she was asked by the FDP to fill the post again due to the crises in Europe. Her successor, Judith Pirscher, had moved to Berlin as State Secretary, leaving the post of District President vacant for two months. She took over the duties of District President on a salaried basis. She left this office again at the end of August 2022. She was succeeded by Anna Bölling.

== Other ==
Marianne Thomann-Stahl is married and has two children. In 1994 and 2004, she took part in the 10th and 12th Federal Assembly for the election of the Federal President of the Federal Republic of Germany on the proposal of the FDP parliamentary group in the state parliament of North Rhine-Westphalia.
