= Wincor Nixdorf =

German corporation

Wincor Nixdorf AG
- Company type: Aktiengesellschaft
- Industry: Information technology
- Founded: 1952
- Fate: Merged on 15 August 2016 to form Diebold Nixdorf.
- Successor: Diebold Nixdorf
- Headquarters: Paderborn, Ostwestfalen-Lippe, Germany
- Key people: Eckard Heidloff (President and CEO), Alexander Dibelius (Chairman of the supervisory board)
- Products: Computer hardware, software, IT services and consulting for bank branches and retail stores; including ATMs and electronic point of sale systems
- Revenue: €2.427 billion (2014/2015)
- Operating income: €21.851 million (2014/2015)
- Net income: €7.772 million (2014/2015)
- Total assets: €1.507 billion (September 2015)
- Total equity: €391.440 million (September 2015)
- Number of employees: 9,100 (September 2015)
- Website: www.wincor-nixdorf.com

Wincor Nixdorf was a German corporation that provided retail and retail banking hardware, software, and services. Wincor Nixdorf was engaged primarily in the sale, manufacture, installation and service of self-service transaction systems (such as ATMs), retail banking equipment, lottery terminals, postal terminals, software and services for global financial and commercial markets.

Following Wincor Nixdorf's IPO in May 2004, KKR and Goldman Sachs sold all of their shares. In total, KKR received over €685 million, broken down into €160 million in dividends in 2004, €225 million (two-thirds of stock market proceeds) in 2005, and €300 million in sales proceeds, also in 2005. During the five years that the Company was owned by KKR and Goldman Sachs, the number of employees at Wincor Nixdorf increased from 3,400 to 6,300.

In October 2015, Wincor Nixdorf’s cashless Payments unit was carved out of the group and started trading independently under the name of AEVI. On August 15, 2016, through the merger of Wincor Nixdorf and Diebold Inc., Diebold Nixdorf was formed as the succeeding international technology and services company.

== History ==
Founded by Heinz Nixdorf, Nixdorf Computer was formed in 1952. In 1990, the company was purchased by Siemens AG and renamed Siemens Nixdorf Informationssysteme. The company was re-focused exclusively on its current product, set in 1998, and renamed Siemens Nixdorf Retail and Banking Systems GmbH. Following a buyout by Kohlberg Kravis Roberts and Goldman Sachs Alternatives on October 1, 1999, the company was renamed Wincor Nixdorf. The company was taken public May 19, 2004, with a successful IPO. On November 8, 2006, Chief Executive Officer Karl-Heinz Stiller announced his resignation from the Board of Directors. Eckard Heidloff was elected as his replacement.

== Corporate relationships ==
=== IBM ===
Following the end of the InterBold partnership in 1997, IBM eventually entered into a re-distribution arrangement with Wincor Nixdorf. IBM sells and services Wincor Nixdorf machinery in several countries in the Americas.

== Security issue ==
On July 12, 2016, the media reported that at least 34 ATMs belonging to the Taiwanese First Commercial Bank had been hacked via a Malware heist. Over 70 million Taiwan dollar (equivalent to 2 million USD) had been withdrawn illegally. The ATMs had been manufactured by Wincor Nixdorf. According to the investigative authority, the international criminal hacker group used mobile devices instead of bank cards to activate the cash-withdrawal process. Security experts from the company were sent to investigate the security breach. At the time of the incident, there were approximately one thousand cash machines of this same type in use in Taiwan. A detailed investigation into the vulnerability began immediately.

On July 17, 2016, Taiwanese authorities declared the case to be solved. The hacker group was found to consist of 16 people from Russia, Romania, and Latvia.
