= Diebold 10xx =

The Diebold 10xx (or Modular Delivery System, MDS) series is a third and fourth generation family of automated teller machines manufactured by Diebold.

== History ==
Introduced in 1985 as a successor to the TABS 9000 series, the 10xx family of ATMs was re-styled to the "i Series" variant in 1991, the "ix Series" variant in 1994, and finally replaced by the Diebold Opteva series of ATMs in 2003.

The 10xx series of ATMs were also marketed under the InterBold brand; a joint venture between IBM and Diebold. IBM machines were marketed under the IBM 478x series. Not all of the 10xx series of ATMs were offered by IBM.

Diebold stopped producing the 1000-series ATM's around 2008.

== 10xx Series Models ==
Members of the 10xx Series included:

- MDS Series - Used a De La Rue cash dispensing mechanism
  - 1060 - Mono-function, indoor counter-top unit with single cash cartridge cash dispenser
  - 1062 - Multi-function, indoor lobby unit
  - 1072 - Multi-function, exterior "through-the-wall" unit
- i Series - Used an ExpressBus Multi Media Dispenser (MMD) cash dispensing mechanism
  - 1060i - Mono-function, indoor counter-top unit with single cash cartridge cash dispenser
  - 1061i - Mono-function, indoor counter-top unit with single cash cartridge cash dispenser
  - 1062i - Multi-function, indoor lobby unit
  - 1064i - Mono-function, indoor cash dispenser
  - 1070i - Multi-function, exterior "through-the-wall" unit with a longer "top-hat throat"
  - 1072i - Multi-function, exterior "through-the-wall" unit
  - 1073i - Multi-function, exterior "through-the-wall" unit, modified for use while sitting in a car
  - 1074i - Multi-function, exterior unit, designed as a stand-alone unit for use in a drive-up lane.
- ix Series - Used an ExpressBus Multi Media Dispenser (MMD) cash dispensing mechanism
  - 1062ix - Multi-function, indoor lobby unit
  - 1063ix - Mono-function, indoor cash dispenser with a smaller screen than the 1064ix
  - 1064ix - Mono-function, indoor cash dispenser
  - 1070ix - Multi-function, exterior "through-the-wall" unit
  - 1071ix - Mono-function, exterior cash dispenser
  - 1072ix - Multi-function, exterior "through-the-wall" unit
  - 1073ix - Multi-function, exterior "through-the-wall" unit, modified for use while sitting in a car
  - 1074ix - Multi-function, exterior unit, designed as a stand-alone unit for use in a drive-up lane.
  - 1075ix - Multi-function, Exterior unit
  - 1077ix - Mono-function, exterior "through-the-wall" unit

== See also ==
- List of Diebold products
