= Dr. Enuf =

Soft drink brand

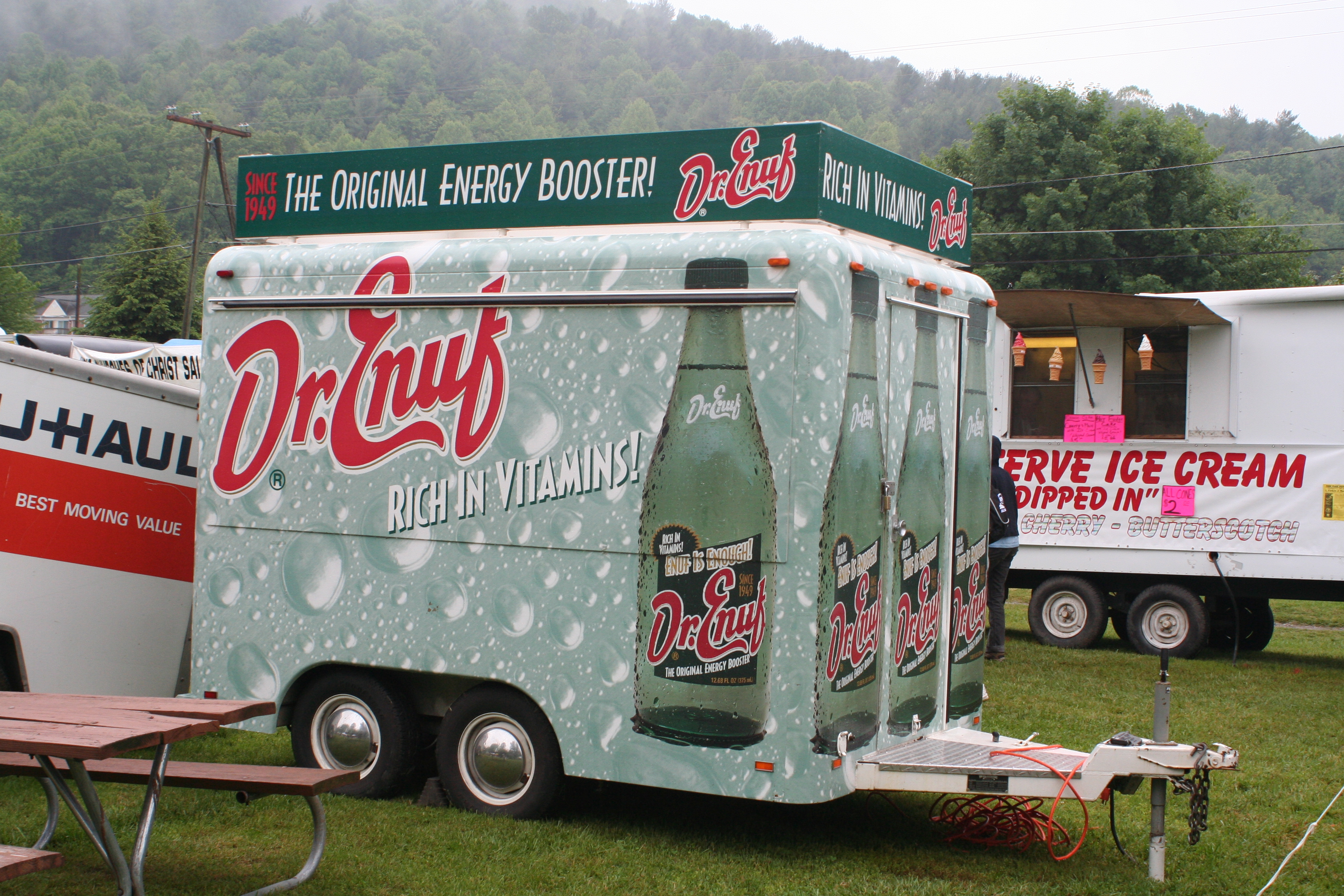
A trailer containing bottles of Dr. Enuf

Dr. Enuf is an American brand of soft drink bottled by Tri-City Beverage in Johnson City, Tennessee. It is a lemon-lime flavored drink (though its taste is different from common lemon-lime sodas such as Sprite or 7 Up.) Dr. Enuf is fortified with several water-soluble vitamins. Its marketing slogan is "Enuf is Enough!" A 12-US-fluid-ounce bottle of Dr. Enuf contains 76 mg of caffeine.

Dr. Enuf's origins date back to 1949, when a Chicago businessman named William Mark Swartz was urged by coworkers to formulate a soft drink fortified with vitamins as an alternative to sugar sodas full of empty calories. He developed an "energy booster" drink containing B vitamins, caffeine and cane sugar. After placing a notice in a trade magazine seeking a bottler, he formed a partnership with Charles Gordon of Tri-City Beverage to produce and distribute the soda.

== Early product heritage with Mountain Dew ==
Mountain Dew was first sold commercially at Johnson City, Tennessee, in 1954 by Tri-City Beverage.

Early in its development, Dr. Enuf was reported to have several therapeutic effects, including the easing of stomach pains, relief from hangovers, and a clearing of the mind. One of the early advertised uses of Dr. Enuf, curing hangovers, coincided with Tri-City Beverage's other soft drink at the time, a drink mixer called Mountain Dew. Tri-City Beverage later sold the rights to Mountain Dew to Pepsi, but kept the Dr. Enuf brand.

The drink is still produced to this day by Tri-Cities Beverage. Dr. Enuf is available in original, Diet, Grape, Herbal, and Diet Herbal varieties. A bottle of any of the varieties contains at least 80% of the recommended daily nutritional requirement of thiamine (Vitamin B1), niacin (Vitamin B_{3}), potassium and iodine. The herbal varieties also contain ginseng and guarana, and are cherry flavored.

On August 6th, 2026, Dr. Enuf introduced Herbal Grape in both regular and zero sugar.

== Availability ==
Dr. Enuf is widely distributed in northeast Tennessee, particularly in the Tri-Cities, plus parts of southwestern Virginia and western North Carolina.

While hard to find, Dr. Enuf is available in select locations throughout the Southeast as well as at many Cracker Barrel locations throughout the country. It is also available at Pal's restaurant locations. As of 2022, Dr. Enuf is also available in Eastern Kentucky.
