= Charles Diebold =

American industrialist (1824–1894)

Charles "Carl" Diebold
- Born: 24 October 1824; Rosenberg, Kingdom of Bavaria
- Died: 5 March 1894 (aged 69); North Canton, Ohio, United States
- Occupation: Industrialist
- Years active: 1859–1894
- Era: Gilded Age
- Known for: Founding Diebold
- Parent(s): Bernhardt Diebold & Mary Diebold

Charles "Carl" Diebold (24 October 1824 – 5 March 1894) was a Bavarian-born American industrialist who was the founder of Diebold. Carl Diebold was also a safe maker and a locksmith.

== Early life ==
Diebold was born in Rosenberg, Kingdom of Bavaria, on 24 October 1824, as the son of Bernhardt Diebold and Mary Diebold. Nothing is known about his early life or his education.

At the 1893 Fourth of July Celebration at Meyer's Lake Canton, Ohio, Carl entered his Mule "Dick" into a race and finished in third place.

== Diebold ==
Diebold founded Diebold Bahmann in 1859 as a manufacturer of safes and vaults in Cincinnati, Ohio. Charles gave his company a good reputation after The Great Chicago Fire in 1871 which leveled most of the city. Rumors went about that the 878 safes in the area had the items in them intact. In 1872, needing more room for his expanding company, moved to Canton, Ohio, where most of the post-fire orders were from. Two years later, in 1874, Wells Fargo asked Diebold to make the world's largest vault at the time: a 32-foot-long, 27-foot-wide, 12-foot high vault that was moved to San Francisco on a 47-car-long train. In 1876 Diebold was incorporated by The State of Ohio as Diebold Safe & Lock Co. Its first international shipment in Diebold's lifetime was to the President of Mexico, Manuel González Flores in 1881. The final major event for the company in his lifetime was the introduction of magnesium steel doors which were billed as TNT-proof, which was becoming a new way for thieves to break into banks.

== Positions at Diebold ==
Position:	Started	Ended
Baumann and Company safemaker/locksmith	1848	1859
Co Founder and President	1859	1876
Superintendent	1876	1894

== Death ==
Carl Diebold died on 5 March 1894, in North Canton, Ohio, after having a stroke and being paralysed.
