= Siemens Nixdorf =

Former German IT/DIS Manufacturer

Siemens Nixdorf Informationssysteme AG
- Logo since 1992
- Predecessor: Nixdorf Computer; Data Information Services of Siemens
- Founded: 1990
- Defunct: 1999
- Fate: Split up
- Successor: Fujitsu Siemens Computers; Wincor Nixdorf
- Website: sni.de at the Wayback Machine (archived 1999-02-08)

Siemens Nixdorf Informationssysteme (SNI) AG was formed in 1990 by the merger of Nixdorf Computer and the Data Information Services (DIS) division of Siemens.

It functioned as a separate company within Siemens.

It was the largest information technology company in Europe until 1999, when it was split into two: Fujitsu Siemens Computers and Wincor Nixdorf. Wincor Nixdorf took over all banking and retail related business.

== Products ==
SNI sold:

- BS2000 and SINIX operating systems
- BS2000 mainframe computers
- a number of databases
- SNI RISC-based RM-x00 servers
- a variety of other hardware and software products (from Personal Computers to SAP R/3).
- ComfoDesk – a GUI shell for enterprise users

== See also ==
- Heinz Nixdorf MuseumsForum
