= UnixWorld =

- editor-in-chief: Dave Flack
- Founder: David Coleman
- First issue: May 1984
- Final issue: December 1995
- Company: McGraw-Hill Publishing Company
- Country: United States
- Based in: Mountain View, CA
- Language: English language
- Website: Historical: "www.unixworld.com" at the Wayback Machine (archived December 19, 1996)

UnixWorld (Unixworld: McGraw-Hill's magazine of open systems computing.) is a defunct magazine about Unix systems, published from May 1984 until December 1995.
