= Heinz Nixdorf MuseumsForum =

Computer museum in Paderborn, Germany

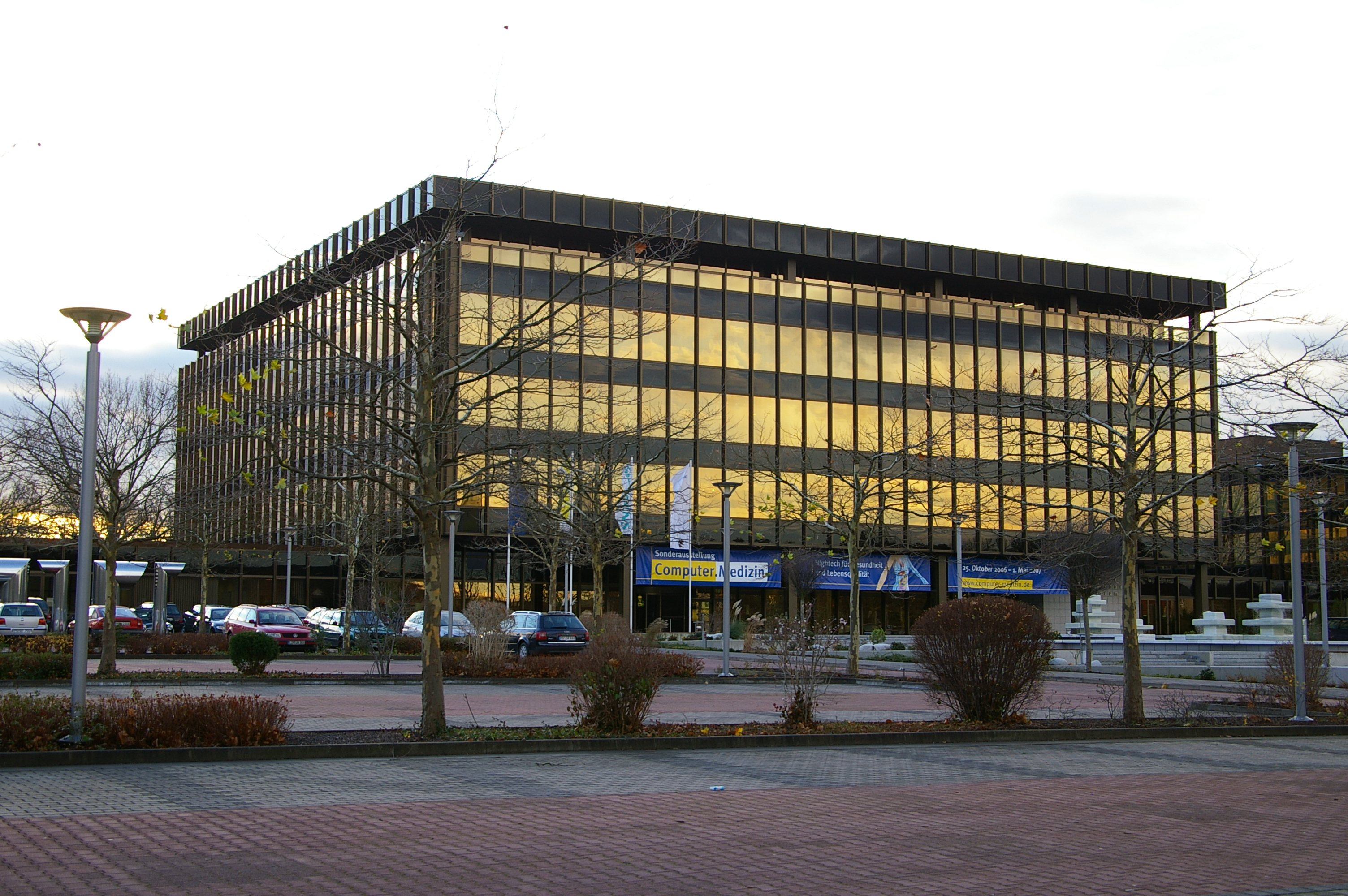
- External view of the museum building
- Established: 24 October 1996; 29 years ago
- Location: Paderborn, Germany
- Coordinates: 51°43′53″N 8°44′8.3″E
- Visitors: 110,000
- Director: Jochen Viehoff
- Architects: Ludwig Thürmer, Gerhard Diel
- Website: www.hnf.de

The Heinz Nixdorf MuseumsForum (HNF) is a computer museum in Paderborn, Germany. The museum is named after the Paderborn computer pioneer and entrepreneur Heinz Nixdorf and is located in the former headquarters of Nixdorf Computer AG.

== History ==
In 1977, Heinz Nixdorf received numerous gifts in the form of historic office machines at the celebrations for the company anniversary of 25 years of Nixdorf Computer AG, which gave him the idea of expanding them into a collection for a computer museum. The museum idea became more concrete in 1983/1984 through purchases with the support of the Cologne office machine expert Uwe Breker. In 1985, the entrepreneur had his first exhibition concept drawn up by Prof. Ludwig Thürmer and his partners, but it was still undecided on the location. In 1986, Heinz Nixdorf died unexpectedly. The Nixdorf employee Willi Lenz, also a member of the "Computermuseum" working group, had the idea of a museum in discussion with the city of Paderborn and in 1990 obtained a positive city council resolution to establish it.

Between 1992 and 1996, the HNF was designed and built on the premises of the former headquarters of Nixdorf Computer AG by the Berlin architects Ludwig Thürmer and Gerhard Diel, and a scientific team led by the mathematician Norbert Ryska. In the presence of the then Federal Chancellor Helmut Kohl, the museum was opened on 24 October 1996. It has an average of over 110,000 visitors annually. The institution is supported by the Westphalia Foundation and the Heinz Nixdorf Foundation, formed from the estate of Heinz Nixdorf.

At 23. Oktober 2021 the HNF was honored by the IEEE as a "Special Citation in History".

== Exhibits ==
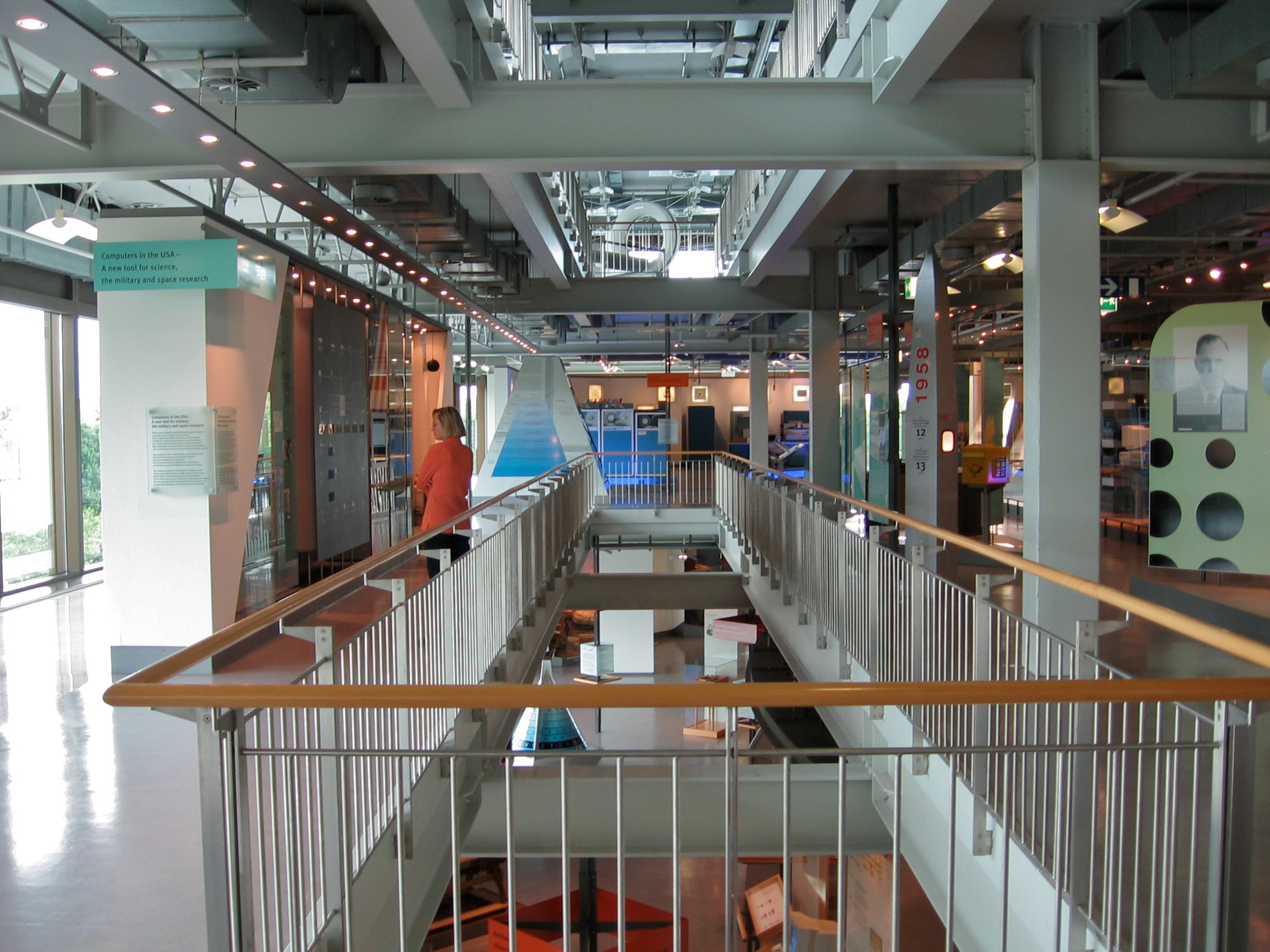
Internal view of the museum

In its permanent exhibition space, the museum presents 5,000 years of information and communications technology (ICT). In a historical journey through time, the story is presented from the origin of writing in Mesopotamia around 3,000 BC to current topics such as the Internet, artificial intelligence, and robotics. In the 6,000 square meters available, more than 5,000 exhibits can be seen, organized on two floors. The influence of information technology on society is curated in lectures, workshops and conferences. Some museum objects are available for access via an online database.

The museum consists of three parts: early history before computers, the history of computers since the 1950s and a possible temporary exhibition.
