= Nixdorf Computer =

German computer company

- Type: Aktiengesellschaft
- Industry: Computer
- Founded: 1952
- Founder: Heinz Nixdorf
- Defunct: 1990
- Successor: Wincor Nixdorf
- Headquarters: Paderborn, West Germany

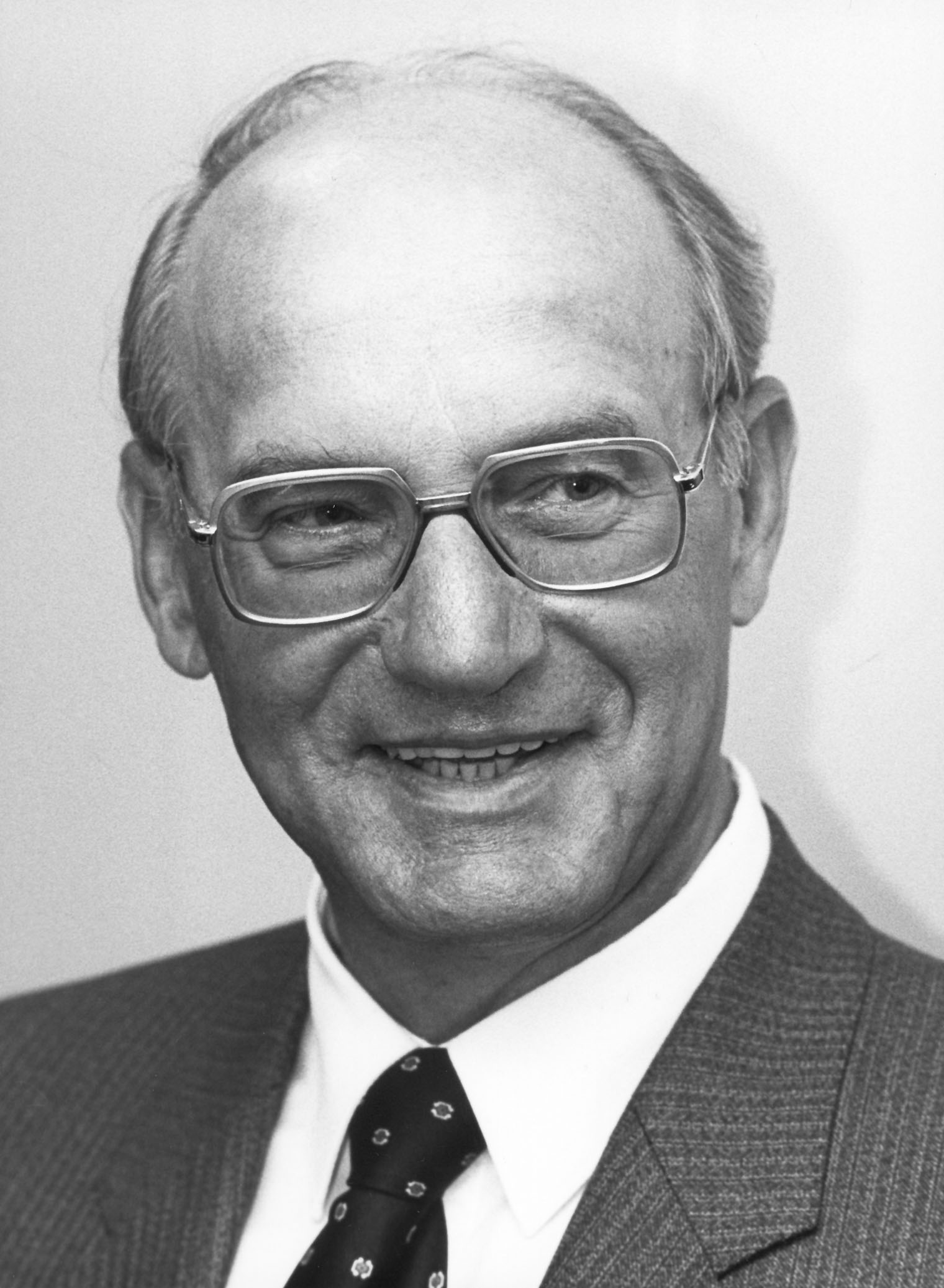
Heinz Nixdorf

Nixdorf Computer AG was a West German computer company founded by Heinz Nixdorf in 1952. Headquartered in Paderborn, Germany, it became the fourth largest computer company in Europe, and a worldwide specialist in banking and point-of-sale systems.

== Labor für Impulstechnik ==
When Nixdorf worked at Remington Rand Corp., he recognized the market potential for calculators. He presented his concept to a few large businesses. The Rheinisch-Westfälisches Elektrizitätswerk (RWE) in Essen showed interest and trust in his ideas, so they gave him 30,000 D-Mark. With that, Nixdorf was able to found the Labor für Impulstechnik on July 1, 1952. The same year, the company delivered their first calculator. Due to their success, the Labor für Impulstechnik delivered to major companies like the Wanderer-Werke in Cologne and the Compagnie des Machines Bull in Paris. They invented many products like the Wanderer Conti, the first desk calculator in the world with a printer in it, and the Nixdorf-Universalcomputer 820. In 1954 the company was compelled to move to another office location, because they needed more space. The fast expansion was the reason why the company rented rooms in Paderborn, Nixdorf's hometown. One year later, the company moved completely to Paderborn and their first own building was built in 1961. Today, there is a museum located there. In 1967, Nixdorf had the idea of not just selling via distributors anymore, but to sell the products by himself. The first companies were built and the Labor für Impulstechnik was also represented in Berlin. The first public move was when the company bought their biggest client, the Wanderer-Werke in Cologne.

== Development of the Nixdorf Computer AG ==
With the buy of the Wanderer shares in 1968, followed the merger between the former Wanderer Werken and the Labor for Impulstechnik to the Nixdorf Computer AG on October 1, the same year. The place of business was in Paderborn. Because of the electronic data processing as a new concept, the company had a quick success. Producers like IBM were trusted on mainframes but Heinz Nixdorf recognized that mainframes were too expensive for many concerns, so he presented the Nixdorf 820. With that he brought the computer directly to the office and the people could afford it.

With the 100 million DM order in 1968, the first computers made their way from Paderborn overseas. Later, the Nixdorf Computer AG also settled down in the United States and in Japan. In the 1970s, the Nixdorf Computer AG grew to the market leader in the mid-range computing in Germany and was the fourth largest computer company in Europe with subsidiaries in Germany, Ireland, Spain, the United States and Singapore. In 1972, it was represented in 22 countries. Because of the expansion, the company grew faster and bigger and so they had to build new buildings. In 1971, the new central office was applied, today it is called the Heinz Nixdorf Aue and in the building is the Heinz Nixdorf Museums Forum and the Heinz Nixdorf Institut of the Universität Paderborn.

In 1975, the Heinz Nixdorf Company produced a new generation of data capturing: the 88xx-line. It was very successful, and in 1978, the Heinz Nixdorf AG sales were a billion DM, with over 10,000 employees worldwide.

With the thought of training his employees, Nixdorf founded a trade school in 1969, which was done in 1972: the Bildungszentrum für informationsverarbeitende Berufe (b.i.b.). Heinz Nixdorf was an ambitious sportsman, and as he wanted his employees to do sports as well, he built the Ahorn-Sportpark in Paderborn right next to the company's central office.

In 1980, Nixdorf purchased a US-based vendor of IBM mainframe software, TCSC (The Computer Software Company), which then became Nixdorf's NCSC (Nixdorf Computer Software Company) subsidiary. TCSC's products included its own operating systems for IBM and compatible mainframes, EDos and EDos/VS; it had licensed the DATACOM/DB database from Applied Data Research (ADR) to run under them. Having purchased TCSC, Nixdorf sought to continue the licensing arrangement; ADR and NCSC went to court in a dispute over whether the licensing arrangement was terminated by the acquisition. ADR and Nixdorf settled out of court in 1981, with an agreement that Nixdorf could continue to resell ADR's products.

Because of its fast growth, the NCAG needed more money. Nixdorf refused an offer from the Volkswagen AG, but agreed with the Deutsche Bank which gave the concern 200 million D-Mark for 25 percent. By going public to the Börse Düsseldorf they got 300 million DM in 1984 as well. One year later, the emission brought 700 million DM. The production capacities in the factories in Germany and abroad were extended.

In 1985, the sales of Nixdorf AG were 4 billion DM, with an after-taxes profit of 172 million. At this time, the company had 23,000 employees in 44 countries. Heinz Nixdorf died of a heart attack on March 17, 1986, at the CeBIT in Hannover.

== Development of the Nixdorf AG after his death ==
The successor of Nixdorf was Klaus Luft, who made some records in the first year. The turnover was 5 billion D-Mark and the company had 30,000 employees. But the company did not adapt to a changing industry and missed important products like the personal computer. In 1987 the company had an operating profit of 330.6 million marks ($180.3 million), however in 1988 this became a operating loss of 59.8 million marks ($32.67 million) in 1988. A cost cutting program was implemented however due to mounting losses, Luft resigned in 1989 and was replaced by Horst Nasko. Because of the loss of money the chairpersons were compelled to sell the company.

== Withdrawal from IBM-compatible mainframe market ==
In 1989, Nixdorf decided to pull out of the IBM-compatible mainframe market, in order to focus on Unix. It transferred its Nixdorf 8890 line of clone IBM mainframes to Comparex Informationssysteme GmbH. However, while Comparex was willing to take over the hardware business, it did not want the responsibility of maintaining Nixdorf's Edos operating system (a fork of IBM's DOS/VS operating system), preferring that its customers purchase mainframe operating systems from IBM instead. Nixdorf decided to cancel all work on the next release of its Edos, since they did not want to commit to maintain any new version in the years to come.

== Takeover by Siemens ==
On October 1, 1990, Siemens took over the Nixdorf shares and the merger between the Nixdorf Computer AG and Siemens followed to the Siemens Nixdorf Informationssysteme (SNI). Thousands of people were made redundant in Paderborn the same year, because Siemens sought to streamline the company. Siemens became the largest computer company in Europe.

== Formation of new companies ==
On October 1, 1999, SNI was taken over by Kohlberg Kravis Roberts and Goldman Sachs Alternatives. The name was changed to Wincor Nixdorf GmbH. Since 2004 the company is going public at the Frankfurter Börse as Wincor Nixdorf AG. It produces cash points, cash registers and reverse vending machines. In 2016, Wincor Nixdorf merged with Diebold, Inc. to produce Diebold Nixdorf.

== Products ==
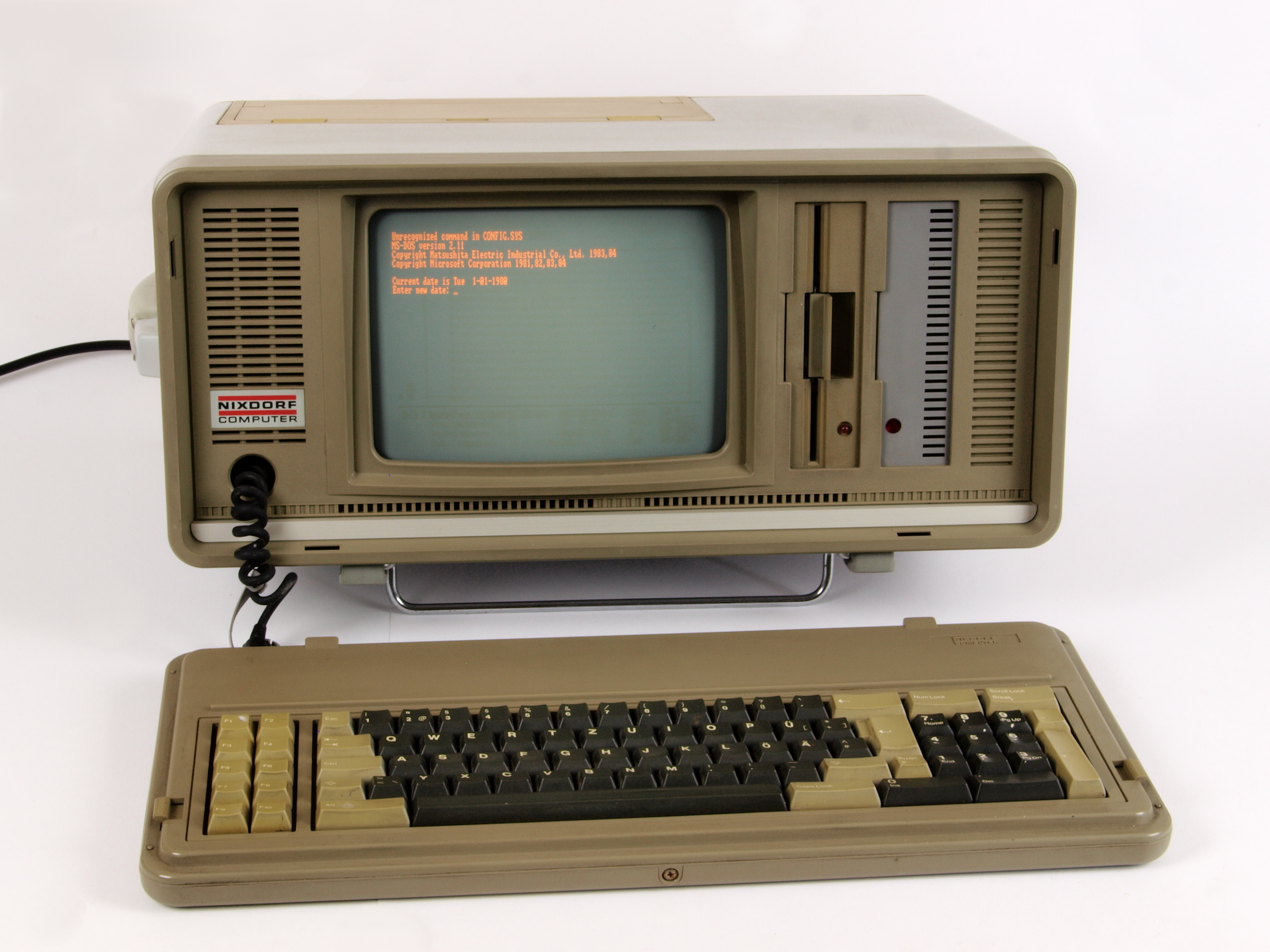
Nixdorf 8810/25

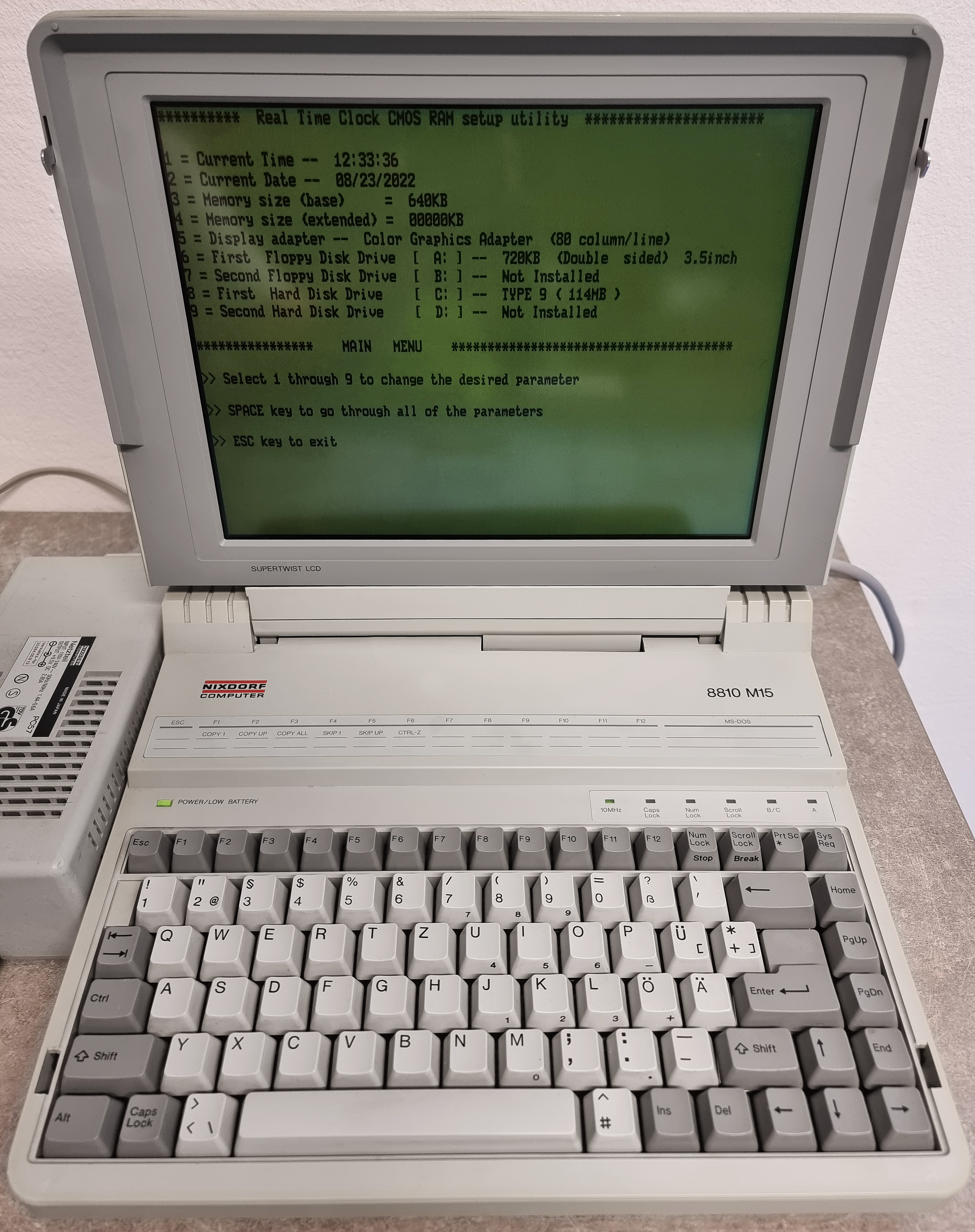
Nixdorf 8810 M15

Selected system families:

- System Family 620 (1974-1984): Based on technologies from the American computer manufacturer Entrex.
- Nixdorf 820 (1968-1979): Built with semiconductor technology, it used early silicon transistors, paired with IBM-sourced type ball terminals. A variety of models were available for different markets.
- Nixdorf 8811 (1975-1979): The Datatel "data telephone" system, equipped with dialpad and LED display, allowed direct access to a computer over the telephone line. Intended for office workers, information could be requested and then shown on the display or printed on a quiet spark printer. Because it was unable to gain approval from the Deutsche Bundespost to be connected to the phone network, it could only be used on internal phone systems, limiting its market success.
- Nixdorf 8818 (1982): ISDN PBX. Nixdorf was the first German company to offer such a system, and was the first approved by the Bundespost. Models 80-600 supported 30-3000 terminals and allowed up to 246 concurrent calls, including 6-participant conference calls. Multiple physically separate PBXs could be joined into a single logical system. Compatible successors were sold until 2006.
- Nixdorf 8862 and 8812 (1976): The 8812 was a computerized point of sale system for retail and hospitality. When connected to an 8862, complete inventory management.
- Nixdorf 8870 (1980): Niros OS, Business Basic, Tamos, Comet. For ERP.
- Nixdorf 8890 (1985): A rebadged IBM System/370 and System/390 compatible system from Hitachi.

Software:

- Edos: an operating system for low-end IBM (and compatible) mainframes, a fork of IBM's DOS/VS operating system (unrelated to DOS for PCs). Acquired in 1980 when Nixdorf purchased its US-based vendor, TCSC (The Computer Software Company), which then became Nixdorf's NCSC (Nixdorf Computer Software Company) subsidiary.
- PWS/VSE-AF (1983): full name Programmer Work Station/VSE-Advanced Functions, a Unix compatibility subsystem for low-end IBM mainframes, based on the Coherent Unix clone developed by Mark Williams Company; it ran under their own Edos/VS and Edos/VSE operating systems, and also IBM's DOS/VS and DOS/VSE.

== See also ==
- Heinz Nixdorf MuseumsForum
