= Remote service software =

Remote service software is used by equipment manufacturers to remotely monitor, access and repair products in use at customer sites. It is a secure, auditable gateway for service teams to troubleshoot problems, perform proactive maintenance, assist with user operations and monitor performance. This technology is typically implemented in mission-critical environments like hospitals or IT data centers – where equipment downtime is intolerable.

== Benefits ==
Remote service software helps to:

- Increase uptime, improve performance and extend the life of a device
- Streamline administration of pay-per-use models, with automated usage monitoring
- Control service costs by deploying patches and upgrades remotely, and ensure a first-time fix when an onsite visit is required
- Focus highly trained service teams on preventative maintenance, by diagnosing and repairing issues before they cause system failure
- Increase customer satisfaction and loyalty

Manufacturers are using aftermarket service a competitive differentiator. Remote service software provides a platform for manufacturers to offer and meet stringent service level agreements (SLAs) without increasing the size of their service team.

- increase in network

== Characteristics ==
- Proactive: Remote monitoring of devices in use allows service teams to detect potential issues before they escalate, degrade performance or cause a system failure. This early warning system is a key component to issue avoidance and ability to meet more stringent key performance indicator (KPIs) in SLAs. Once an issue is detected, service professionals can also use remote service technology gateways to push patches or resolve issues.
- Secure: Secure access is a core consideration of remote service. Solutions should adhere to compliance guidelines and protect the remote connection between the manufacturer and the customer – ensuring that no data has been stolen and no outsiders have been granted access.
- Auditable: (SOX, HIPAA and PCI) compliance regulations require businesses to keep track of who does what on their network. Auditors require forensic logs to trace the steps of every interaction a remote service technician has with every device.

== Other names ==
- IDM: Intelligent device management
- SSM: Strategic service management
- RDM: Remote device management
