= Mark Williams Company =

Software company that created Coherent

- Industry: Software industry
- Founded: 1977 in Chicago, Illinois, U.S.
- Founders: Robert Swartz
- Defunct: 1995
- Fate: Disestablished
- Headquarters: Northbrook, Illinois, U.S.
- Products: Coherent

The Mark Williams Company was a small software company in Chicago, Illinois (later moved to Northbrook) that created Coherent, one of the first Unix-like operating systems for IBM PCs and several C programming language compilers. It was founded by Robert Swartz (father of Aaron Swartz) in 1977 and discontinued operations in 1995. The name comes from the middle name of Robert Swartz's father, William Mark Swartz.

Robert Swartz moved the company (originally producing a soft drink called Dr. Enuf) into software with his father's help and the company became known as the Mark Williams Company.

Mark Williams won a patent lawsuit (U.S. patent 4,956,809) centered on 'byte ordering'. Separately, and at that time, Linux had made serious inroads in the UNIX clone market. Since Coherent was a commercially available package and Linux was distributed freely on the Internet via their GNU General Public License, Coherent sales plummeted and Swartz had no choice but to cease operations in 1995.

== Products ==
- Produced Coherent, a clone of Unix.
- csd, C source debugger.
- Let's C, low-cost professional C compiler for the IBM PC and MS-DOS.
- Mark Williams C for CP/M-86.
- Mark Williams C for the Atari ST, first major C programming environment for the ST computers.
- XYBasic, a process control BASIC running on CP/M that could be burned on to memory (EPROM) and run on an 8080 standalone processor.

== See also ==
- Unix-like
