= Heinz Nixdorf =

German computer businessman (1925–1986)

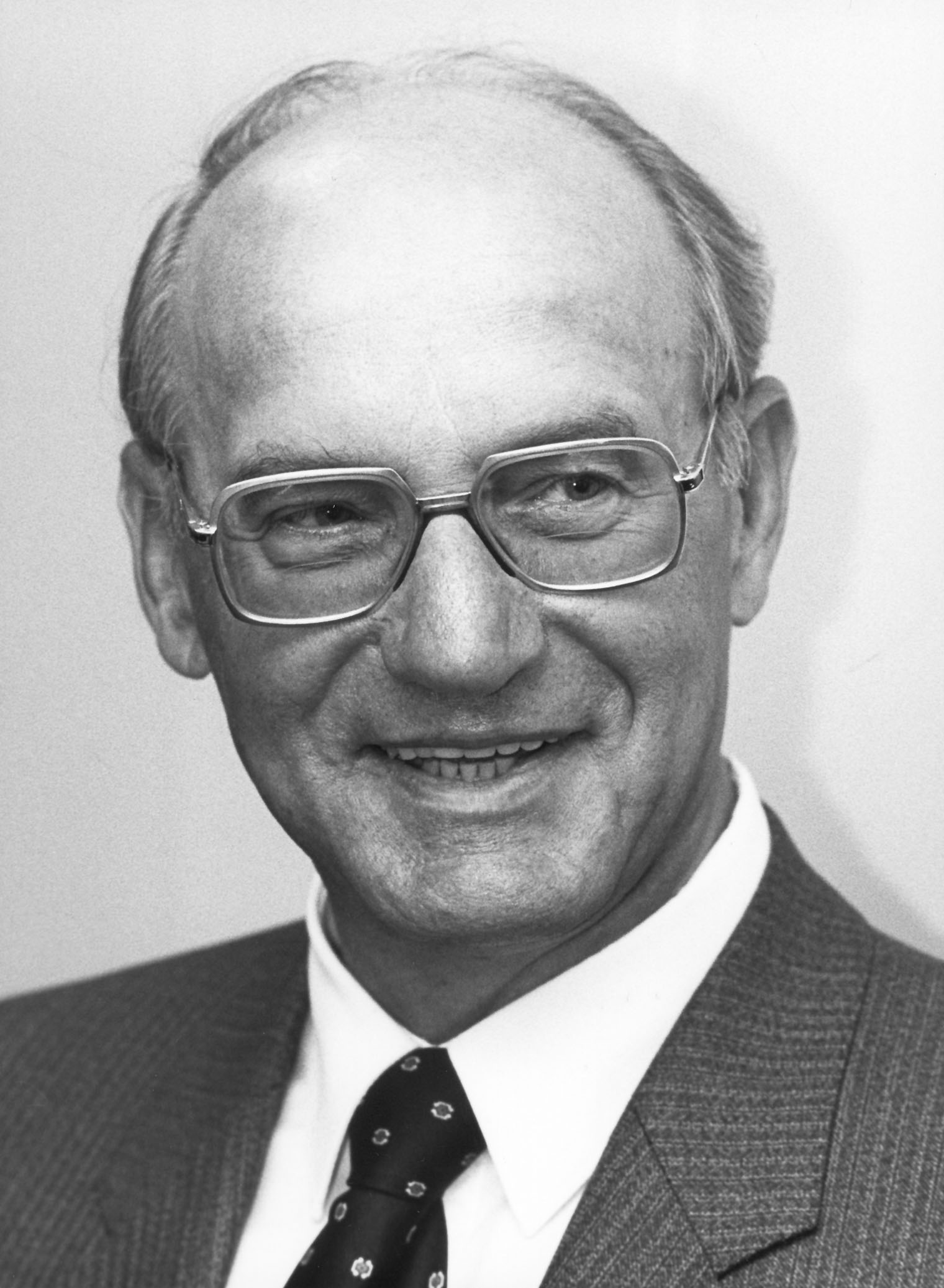
- Born: 9 April 1925; Paderborn, Westphalia, Germany
- Died: 17 March 1986 (aged 60); Hanover, Lower Saxony, West Germany
- Known for: Founder of Nixdorf Computer

Heinz Nixdorf (9 April 1925 – 17 March 1986) was a German computing pioneer, businessman and founder of Nixdorf Computer AG.

Nixdorf was born in Paderborn, Germany.

The 27-year-old Nixdorf, at the time a physics student at the Goethe University Frankfurt, founded his first computer company in 1952. As the owner, he led this company to become an international electronics company with revenues of almost four billion Deutsche Mark at its peak. His microcomputers were competitors to IBM mainframes. Nixdorf is remembered as one of the entrepreneurs who, in the 1950s to 1970s, symbolized the German economic miracle. He was also an ambitious athlete and is remembered for his efforts to provide good education to his employees. He succumbed to a heart attack in 1986 at the CeBIT in Hanover. The Heinz Nixdorf MuseumsForum was named after him.

== Early life ==
Nixdorf was born on 9 April 1925, as the oldest child of five. He went to a Catholic board school where he first showed his talent for mathematics and science. Due to his father's unemployment during the 1920s and 30s, his childhood was defined by poverty. Achieving good grades in school, he was offered a scholarship to become a teacher. Uninterested in pursuing that career, Nixdorf wrote a letter to the Ministry of Education in Berlin. As a result, he was granted permission to attend the Reismann-Gymnasium in Paderborn starting in 1941. In 1942, Nixdorf was drafted by the Wehrmacht and served on the Eastern Front. Nixdorf joined the Nazi Party in 1943. In 1944 he was a member of the 1st Fallschirm-Panzer Division Hermann Göring. Nixdorf completed his education in 1947, receiving the Abitur.

== Education ==
With the aid of a scholarship, Nixdorf studied physics at the Johann-Wolfgang-Goethe Universität in Frankfurt am Main in 1947. In addition to his education in physics, he also attended seminars in business economics. In 1951 Nixdorf started working for the development department of Remington Rand Corp. There he gained knowledge of simple adding machines and met Walter Sprick, whose assistant he became. Leaving Remington to work at IBM, Sprick handed some of his work and inventions over to Nixdorf. Based on those concepts, Nixdorf developed the Elektronensaldierer and the Elektronenmultiplizierer.

== Founding and development of the company ==
In 1952 Nixdorf founded the Labor für Impulstechnik in Essen. On September 5, 1952, Nixdorf hired his first employee, an electronics technician named Alfred Wierzioch. In 1954 they released their first vacuum-tube computer, called ES, for the local electric utility company. From this point on the company grew rapidly, becoming a supplier of electronic computing devices to other companies, including Wanderer, at the time the leading German manufacturer of office machines.

In 1959 the company moved to Paderborn where Nixdorf was born. Utilizing his connections there he had ambitious plans to grow his company. In 1961 his company had 60 employees. In 1965 the Wanderer Logatronic, an electronic desk calculator, was presented at Hannover Messe. It was the first electronic calculator to use semiconductors, revolutionary for the time. In 1967, Nixdorf developed the Logatronic into the Nixdorf 820 in 1967, which was very successful. In 1968 Nixdorf bought Wanderer and renamed the company Nixdorf Computer AG.

== National and international success ==
The national and international success of the brand started in the 70s. By 1985 the company's revenue was about four billion D-Mark and it employed 24,000 people in 44 countries. Nixdorf died of a heart attack on 17 March 1986, at the CeBIT in Hannover.

== Nixdorf as an employer ==
Nixdorf was invested in the education of his employees, which he promoted with a lot of personal effort and money. In 1969 he founded a trade school on the company premises. Furthermore, he supported the Universität-Gesamthochschule Paderborn. He also enabled his employees to exercise physically, offering sports courses and building the Ahorn-Sportpark in Paderborn in 1984. The sports park was also open to the public, and is still free of charge today.

Nixdorf also played an instrumental role in the building of Paderborn airport, after threatening to move the company to Frankfurt am Main if no adequate infrastructure were provided. The Paderborn Lippstadt Airport was built and was opened in 1971. Its construction cost was 13.7 million D-Mark.

== Personal life ==
Nixdorf married Renate Ring in 1960. The couple had three sons, one of whom, Martin Nixdorf, is the current chairman of the Heinz-Nixdorf-Stiftung and the Stiftung Westfalen.
