= Fine print =

Text in a small size

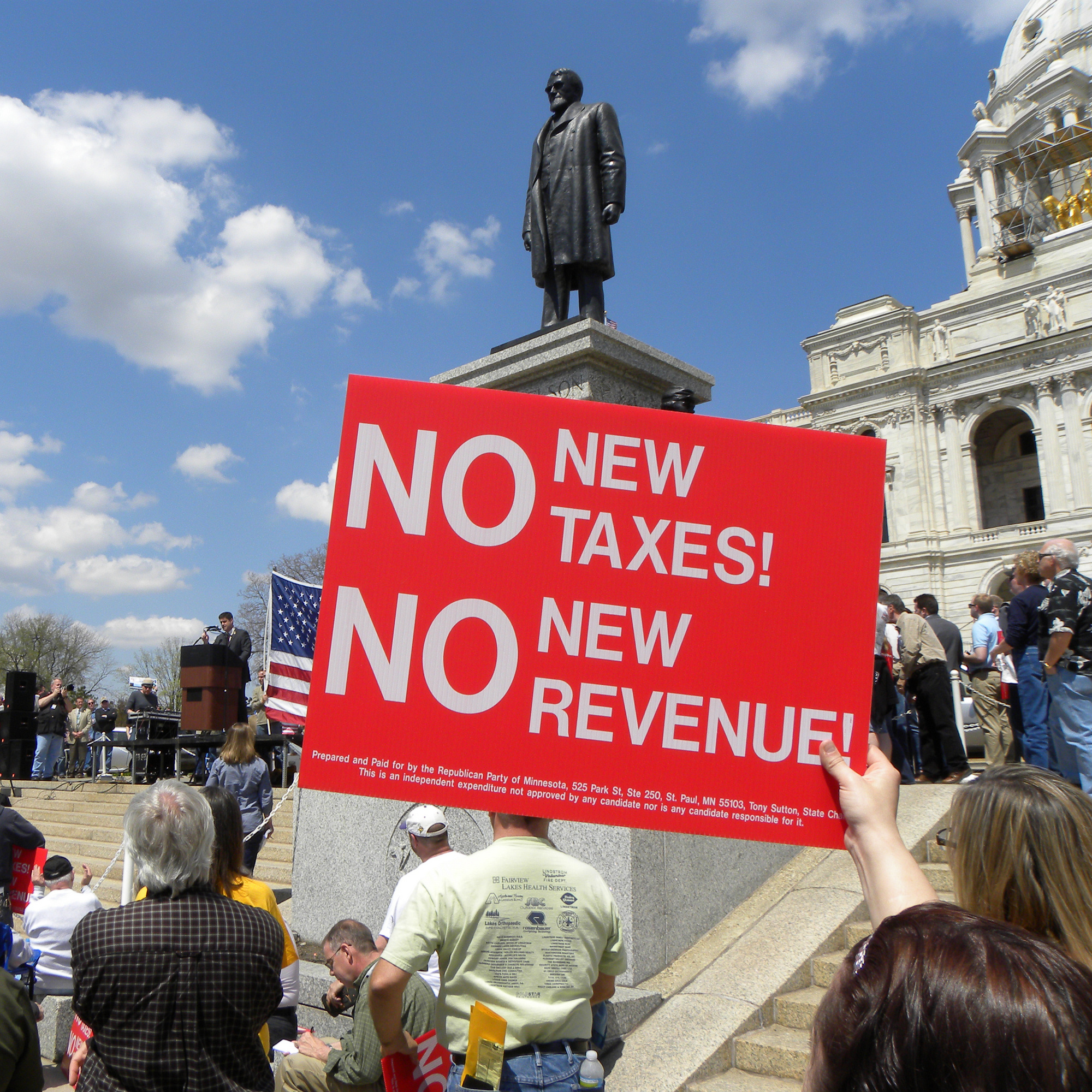
U.S. political endorsement signs often have fine print disclaimers.

Fine print, small print, or mouseprint is less noticeable print smaller than the more obvious larger print it accompanies that advertises or otherwise describes or partially describes a commercial product or service. The larger print that is used in conjunction with fine print by the merchant often has the effect of deceiving the consumer into believing the offer is more advantageous than it really is. This may satisfy a legal technicality which requires full disclosure of all (even unfavorable) terms or conditions, but does not specify the manner (size, typeface, coloring, etc.) of disclosure. There is strong evidence that suggests the fine print is not read by the majority of consumers.

Fine print may say the opposite of what the larger print says. For example, if the larger print says "pre-approved" the fine print might say "subject to approval". Especially in pharmaceutical advertisements, fine print may accompany a warning message, but this message is often neutralized by the more eye-catching positive images and pleasant background music (eye candy). Sometimes television advertisements flash text fine print in camouflagic colors, and for brief periods of time, making it difficult or impossible for the viewer to read.

The use of fine print is a common advertising technique in certain market niches, particularly those of high-margin specialty products or services uncompetitive with those in the mainstream market. The practice, for example, can be used to mislead the consumer about an item's price or value, or the nutritional content of a food product.

In the US, the Federal Trade Commission (FTC) regulations state that, for an advertised offer to be lawful, the terms of the offer must be clear and conspicuous, not relegated to fine print. US FTC regulations state that unfair or deceptive acts or practices in or affecting commerce are unlawful. (15 USC § 45 (a)) In relevant part, they state that contingent conditions and obligations of an offer must be set forth clearly and conspicuously at the outset of the offer, and that disclosure of the terms of the offer set forth in a footnote of an advertisement to which reference is made by an asterisk or other symbol placed next to the offer, is not regarded as making disclosure at the outset. (16 CFR 251.1)

== Controversial aspects ==
Fine print is controversial because of its deceptive nature. Its purpose is to make the consumer believe that the offer is really great. Though the real truth about the offer is technically available to the consumer in the smaller print of the advertisement—thus virtually ensuring plausible deniability from claims of fraud—it is often designed to be overlooked. The unsuspecting customer, who can instantly see all the attractive aspects of the offer, will, due to natural impulsive behavior, time constraints, and/or personal need, generally not bother to learn the caveats, instead focusing on the positives of the deal.

Many offers advertised in large print only apply when certain conditions are met. In many cases, these conditions are difficult or nearly impossible to meet.

In many cases, the business states in fine print that it reserves the right to modify the terms of the contract at any time with little to no advance notice. This controversial practice is often seen in the banking and insurance industries. It is also widely abused in terms of use statements and privacy policies. However, in early 2009, the federal case of Harris v. Blockbuster Inc. ruled that these "unilateral modification clauses" were illusory and, thus, unenforceable.

In some cases, the seller who uses this technique will engage in the practice of bait and switch. The customer will be told when ready to purchase that for one reason or another, they will not be eligible for the advertised offer, and will be coerced into one that is higher priced (see Hard sell). Reasons they may be given include their age, race, religion, credit rating, size or location of residence, the type of vehicle they own, the amount of prior business they have done with that company, or the variety of the item they wish to purchase. Often when this occurs, the limitations that render them ineligible will apply to an overwhelming majority of consumers.

Very frequently, consumers, eager to obtain a product or service they have the dire need or wish for, or that they have been coerced into obtaining, will sign their names on a binding contract. A court may find the consumer to be liable to the terms of the contract, although stated only by the fine print, and an exit from these terms may be costly or impossible.

Some examples of how consumers are deceived are as follows:

- A credit card, advertised with a 0% rate in large print, will offer this only for an introductory period of a few months. After that, the rate will switch, for example, to a much higher rate of 19.95%, and may increase even more due to universal default.
- A contract may use small print that may pass unnoticed to require a customer or subscriber to pay various fees that are not stated in the headline price. A subscriber to, for example, a cell phone contract may be bound to the contract for a specified period, subject to a large payment for early termination. Tickets for air travel may exclude taxes, luggage charges, and other unavoidable "extras". Some contracts—and sometimes services payable after a free trial period—automatically renew if not cancelled by a specified time. A holiday may advertise an attractive price in large print, with "per person, double occupancy" in small print. Words such as "from" or "as low as" may be under-emphasised in offers where more than the minimum is usually wanted.
- An item such as a car may be advertised at far below its market value in large print, with conditions, such as military membership, or a trade-in, listed in small print.
- Auto repair shops frequently advertise either with coupons or large signs outside their businesses for common maintenance and repair services, such as oil changes, tune-ups, and tires. These ads fail to mention factors that may raise that price, such as fees and add-ons for various services, mechanics telling customers more costly repairs are necessary or else the vehicle may be further damaged, or the price being for each individual part (such as a wheel), where the vehicle has several of that part all needing the service, and thereby multiplying the cost by that number. Many ads will also state in fine print "most cars," but in reality, most cars, including that of the customer seeking the service, will be excluded.
- Warranties: The warranties for many products, such as automobiles, are offered or sold with the promise that they will cover a large number of scenarios, should they occur, and often routine maintenance. But they are accompanied by fine print to exclude virtually all repairs that will likely be needed. The coverage for some routine maintenance may also be a lure in which the service center will intentionally damage the vehicle, unknown to its owner, thereby forcing the owner to return for additional costly repairs in the future.
- Insurance policies: Particularly health and life insurance will exclude a good deal of scenarios in which one would normally file a claim. For example, life insurance will not normally cover suicides within a specified time after the policy is bought, and homeowners' insurance will not normally cover arson.
- Rebates: Many products are advertised with a price printed in large numbers. However, a higher price is printed above in much smaller numbers, and the large-print price is only given after a rebate. Initially, the customer must first pay the high price. In order for the rebate to be redeemed, the customer must then follow a set of instructions. In some cases, meeting all the requirements necessary in order to obtain the rebate may be difficult, and as a result, many rebates are denied.
- Infomercial products: These come in many forms. Often, companies either load their sales with a lot of fine print, or simply do not abide by their promises (the latter is technically illegal, but many are not worried because the amount they make from ripping people off usually makes up for the amount of fines they pay to the government).
- Online Marketing Scheme: Many online marketers attracted consumers with free trials and asked for their credit card details to manage the shipment of the products. However, FTC found out that they were using hidden charges to take money from the customers without their approval.

== Fine print on TV and other video media ==
A common practice has been to use fine print in advertising on television. In such a case, the fine print is displayed at the bottom of the screen in a manner where it is not noticeable to many viewers, or is displayed for such a short time that no one has the time to read the entire paragraph without an artificial means of stopping the commercial, i.e. record it or freeze frame it, such as with a digital video recorder (DVR), in order to read it. The attention is drawn away from this little section by the more eye-catching or large print description of the offer, which alone is untrue.

Fine print is often illegible, e.g., when a TV picture is noisy, low-resolution, or the viewer's sight is impaired. Banking offers have been displayed on video billboards by highways that are unreadable by passing drivers.

=== Verbal fine print ===
Some TV and radio commercials are concluded with "fast talking", which is barely audible or comprehensible to most. While it is this very message that states all necessary disclaimers and exceptions to the advertisement, it is often stated too fast for the viewer or listener to comprehend. This is often coupled with pleasant background music and positive images, which in turn takes the consumer's focus off the disclaimer.

== Fighting fine print ==
Many consumer advocates are active in lobbying for laws to limit the rights of an advertiser to use fine print to hide the truth, and to expand rights to consumers who fall victim to fine print. Due to free speech that is granted to advertisers, passing such laws in the United States has proven to be difficult.

=== Credit cards ===
Consumer advocates have widely criticized the credit card industry for its increasing ruthlessness in its practices, which allow the banks seemingly unlimited rights to charge whatever fees they wish, to rewrite the terms and conditions faced by the consumer at will, and to not be challenged by the consumer in their practices. The consumer who initially obtained the card was inevitably drawn by the large print, which was accompanied by pages of fine print few are likely to read in full or to understand. During the 1990s, two laws against such practices were overturned by the U.S. Supreme Court, and these rulings are said to have opened the floodgates for even more ruthless practices.

=== Rebates ===
Several states have considered laws that would require retailers to provide advertised rebates to customers at the time of the purchase with no strings attached. These laws have been widely opposed by corporations, and are yet to have passed in any states, except Connecticut and Rhode Island, where they are only allowed if unadvertised.

=== Banking ===
Advertising by conventional banks is relatively highly regulated, requiring disclosures that generally are made, but appear in small print. In some cases, the minimum size of any small print is regulated, such as credit card advertising/application Schumer box disclosure requirements. One bank offered non-FDIC-insured CDs yielding 10% in letters almost 3″ high, while the small print 1/16″ high disclosed the lack of insurance.

== See also ==
- Teaser rate
- Trojan horse (business)
- Privacy policy § Criticism
