= Offshore credit card =

Offshore credit cards are credit cards issued by an offshore bank in a jurisdiction that is different from that of the cardholder. Real 'unsecured' offshore credit cards with credit lines are very difficult for the average person to obtain because banks refuse to issue them. Most banks will need possession of reliable credit histories and a means of getting their money back. If a customer is somewhere 'offshore' the risk of extending a credit line is too great and so as a result these cards are only issued to clients that have long standing relationships with the bank in question. Therefore, an 'unsecured' offshore credit card advertised online may be a scam.

== Secured cards ==
Since most banks will not offer credit lines without some kind of security, they offer 'secured' offshore credit cards as an alternative. Secured offshore credit cards involve depositing a certain amount (usually 125-150% of the credit line) to cover what you borrow. For a credit line of US$20,000 for example, a deposit of US$25,000-30,000 may be required. This aside, the card operates to all intents and purposes like a normal credit card, and most carry a major label such as Visa or Mastercard.

== Debit cards ==
Another type of card often marketed as a credit card is an offshore debit card. Offshore debit cards are linked to an offshore bank account and do not involve any extensions of credit whatsoever. The only money that may be spent is the amount stored in the offshore bank account itself. An offshore Visa Debit card or Debit Mastercard is accepted worldwide just like a credit card.
