= Charge-off =

Declaration by a creditor that debt is uncollectable

A charge-off or chargeoff is a declaration by a creditor (usually a credit card account) that an amount of debt is unlikely to be collected. This occurs when a consumer becomes severely delinquent on a debt. Traditionally, creditors make this declaration at the point of six months without payment. A charge-off is a form of write-off.

== Legal consequences of a charge-off ==
While a charge-off is considered to be "written off as uncollectable" by the lender, the debt is still legally valid and remains so after the fact. The creditor has the right to legally collect the full amount for the time period permitted by the statute of limitations applicable to the location of the financial institution and the consumer's residence. Depending on the location, this period may be a certain number of years (e.g. three to seven years) or, in some places, indefinite. Methods of collection that can be used include contacts from internal collections staff, outside collection agencies, arbitration, or a lawsuit.

== United States ==
=== Tax regulations ===
In the United States, federal regulations require creditors to charge off installment loans after 120 days of delinquency, while revolving credit accounts must be charged-off after 180 days.

The purpose of making such a declaration is to help support a tax deduction for bad debts under Section 166 of the Internal Revenue Code. In that respect it is a form of write-off. Bad debts and even fraud are simply part of the cost of doing business. The charge-off, though, does not free the debtor of having to pay the debt.

=== Effects on credit report ===
A charge-off is one of the most adverse factors that can be listed on a credit report. It will then be listed as such on the debtor's credit bureau reports (Equifax, for instance, lists "R9" in the "status" column to denote a charge-off.) The item will include relevant dates, and the amount of the bad debt. This may make obtaining any unsecured or even secured credit more difficult.

If the charge-off has been paid in full, it will be listed on the credit report as "paid in full". If settled for less than the amount due, it will be listed as "settled". Even such a listing on a credit report can be negative.

=== Effects on banks ===
As the number of charge-offs climbs or becomes erratic, officials from the bank's regulators take a close look at the finances of the bank. They may impose various operating restrictions on the bank and, in the most extreme cases, may close the bank entirely.
