= Debt-lag =

Condition that happens when a credit card is overused

Debt-Lag is a condition which results from overuse of a credit card or other forms of credit while travelling. The debt itself can refer to the amount spent in the lead up to travelling, during the trip and any unexpected costs which come about from that trip, such as cross currency conversion fees and foreign ATM access charges. The condition of debt-lag may last months or even years after a person's trip is complete, as long as the debt accrued within the travel period is still outstanding.

The term debt-lag is similar to jet lag in that both have to do with travel, however travellers can be affected by debt-lag without leaving their time zone. Jet lag refers to the condition sustained by the body after rapid long-distance travel which requires days of adjustment upon return. Debt-lag works in much the same way as it refers to a traveller's need to adjust upon return as well, except it is more directly related to the traveller's financial situation than their biological one.

== Causes ==
Debt-lag is primarily attributed to spending on credit cards while abroad, including paying for items before travel such as transportation costs and accommodation. It is estimated that roughly 85% of travellers use their credit card while on holiday, presumably because of the ease of use, wide acceptance, ability to earn rewards points and security features of credit cards.

Debt-lag is not strictly tied to the distance or duration of a trip, but longer trips will typically cost more and thus cause more severe cases of debt-lag. It is a financial problem more commonly found in men than in women, with over two in five men suffering credit card shock upon return compared to less than one in three women.

The speed at which a person recovers from debt-lag is largely dependent on the individual's financial situation and any extenuating circumstances met with while travelling. Lack of travel insurance in cases of emergency and/or disruption to travel can exacerbate debt-lag, especially with one in four travelling without cover. One of the most common unexpected costs incurred while travelling overseas is last-minute transport or accommodation changes, which could be covered by a comprehensive travel insurance policy.

A common cause of debt-lag is tied to fees and charges by financial institutions to access their services while overseas. In fact, these hidden charges, such as currency conversion fees and foreign ATM access charges, are cited as the top "travel rip-offs" experienced by travellers.

There is no maximum to debt-lag attributed debt, although it is largely limited by an individual's credit limit and ability to accrue debt. Inversely, there is no limit to the amount of time it takes to resolve debt-lag as repayment habits, compound interest charges and the ability to continually accrue debt even after the trip is complete can make the debt rollover perpetually. Over a third of people would holiday again before paying down their debt-lag induced debt, lengthening the duration of this condition.

== Management ==
Careful budgeting and monitoring of expenses can prevent debt-lag. This includes preparation, research and budgeting around optimal financial products for travel, both before and after a trip.

=== Before travelling ===
Many banks and financial institutions will have specific travel products on offer such as prepaid travel money cards or credit cards with little or no currency conversion fees and complimentary travel insurance. These kinds of financial products will often be far better suited to travel than typical banking products and will minimise the amount spent on fees and charges associated with travel. Another alternative option for travellers to take their money with them is traveller's checks. These are a very secure method of taking money abroad but aren’t widely accepted.

=== During Travel ===
There are a few product features that will affect how you should use your financial products overseas. These include:

- credit card purchase credit card purchase rate and cash advance rates
- prepaid travel card reload fees
- foreign ATM usage fees
- currency conversion fees

Knowing these fees and the circumstances in which they are charged can help travellers avoid them and thus lowers the chances of severe debt-lag upon return.

=== After Travelling ===
The period directly after travel is crucial to minimising the long-term effects of debt-lag. If the debt is paid off in a timely manner, the traveller can avoid paying interest, especially if they incorporated interest free days into their budget before travelling.

While the majority of travellers believe they can pay back their debt within just a few months, those who fail to do so can find themselves paying thousands in interest on top of having to pay back their initial debt amount. A balance transfer of the debt to a low rate or zero percent credit card can help alleviate the stress of long-term debt-lag.
