= Credit card =

Card for financial transactions on credit

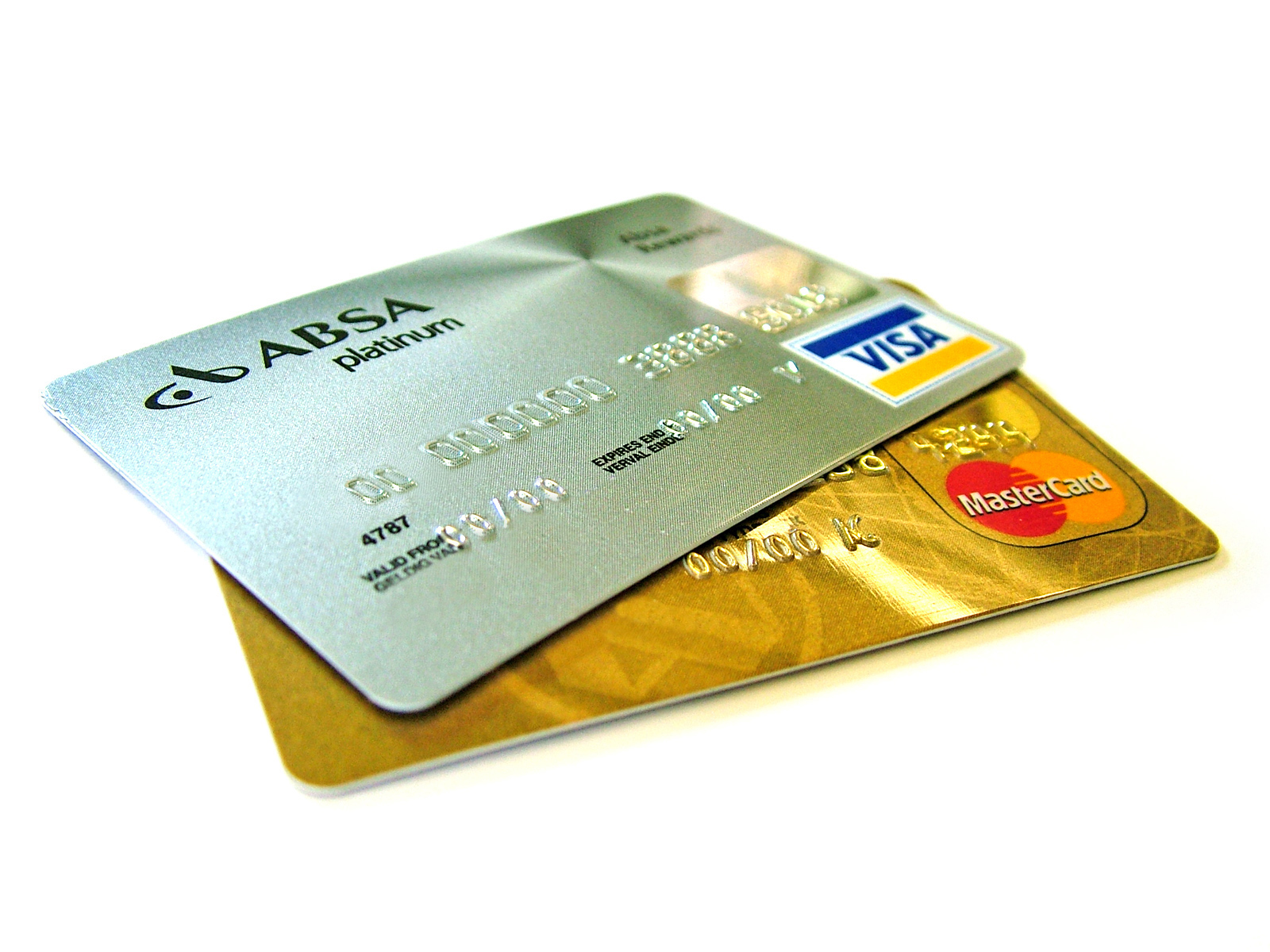
Examples of credit cards (from Absa Bank in South Africa)

A credit card (or charge card) is a payment card, usually issued by a bank, allowing the card's users to purchase goods and services, or withdraw cash on credit. Card use thereby accrues debt that must be repaid later.

A normal credit card differs from a charge card, which requires the balance to be repaid in full each month or at the end of each statement cycle. By contrast, credit cards allow consumers to build a continuing debt balance, subject to interest charged at a specific rate. Moreover, a credit card differs from a charge card in that a credit card typically involves a third-party entity that pays the seller and is reimbursed by the buyer, whereas a charge card simply defers payment by the buyer until a later date. A credit card also differs from a debit card, which can be used like currency by the card's owner.

In June 2018, there were 7.75 billion credit cards in the world. In 2020, there were 1.09 billion credit cards in circulation in the United States; with 72.5% of adults (187.3 million people) having at least one credit card.

== History ==
=== Early charge cards and coins ===
Starting in the late 19th century, charge cards were available in various shapes and sizes; they were made of celluloid, copper, aluminum, steel, and other types of whitish metals. Some cards were shaped like coins, with a small hole allowing them to be placed on key rings. These charge coins were usually given to customers having charge accounts with hotels or department stores. Each card had a charge account number, along with the merchant's name and logo.

By imprinting the coin onto a sales slip, the charge card and charge coin offered a convenient way to copy the identifying information of a charge account. The Charga-Plate, developed by Farrington Manufacturing Company in 1928, was an early predecessor of the credit card and was used in the US from the 1930s until the late 1950s. It was a 2 1/2-by-1 1/4-inch (64 mm × 32 mm) rectangle of sheet metal embossed with the customer's name, city, and state, which held a small paper card on its back for signature. When recording a purchase, the plate was laid into a recess in the imprinter device with a paper charge slip and an inked ribbon on top; these were pressed together to record the imprint. Charga-Plates were issued by large-scale merchants to their regular customers, much like later department-store credit cards. In some cases, the plates were kept in the issuing store rather than being held by customers. When an authorized user made a purchase, a clerk retrieved the plate from the store's files and then processed the purchase. Charga-Plates sped up bookkeeping and reduced manual copying errors.

==== Air Travel Card ====
In 1934, American Airlines and the Air Transport Association simplified the process further with the advent of the Air Travel Card. They created a numbering scheme that identified the card's issuer as well as the customer's account. With an Air Travel Card, passengers could "buy now, and pay later" for a ticket against their credit and receive a 15% discount at any accepting airline. By the 1940s, all major US airlines offered Air Travel Cards that could be used with 17 different airlines. By 1941, about half of the airlines' revenues came through the Air Travel Card agreement. In addition, the airlines offered installment payment plans to attract new travelers to purchase airline tickets. In 1948, the Air Travel Card became the first internationally valid charge card for all members of the International Air Transport Association.

==== Early general-purpose charge cards ====
The concept of customers using the same card to pay different merchants was expanded in 1950 by Ralph Schneider and Frank McNamara, the founders of Diners Club, to consolidate multiple cards. Diners Club, which was created partly through a merger with Dine and Sign, produced the first "general purpose" charge card and required the entire bill to be paid with each statement. That card was followed by Carte Blanche, and in 1958 by American Express, which created a worldwide charge card network.

=== BankAmericard and Master Charge ===
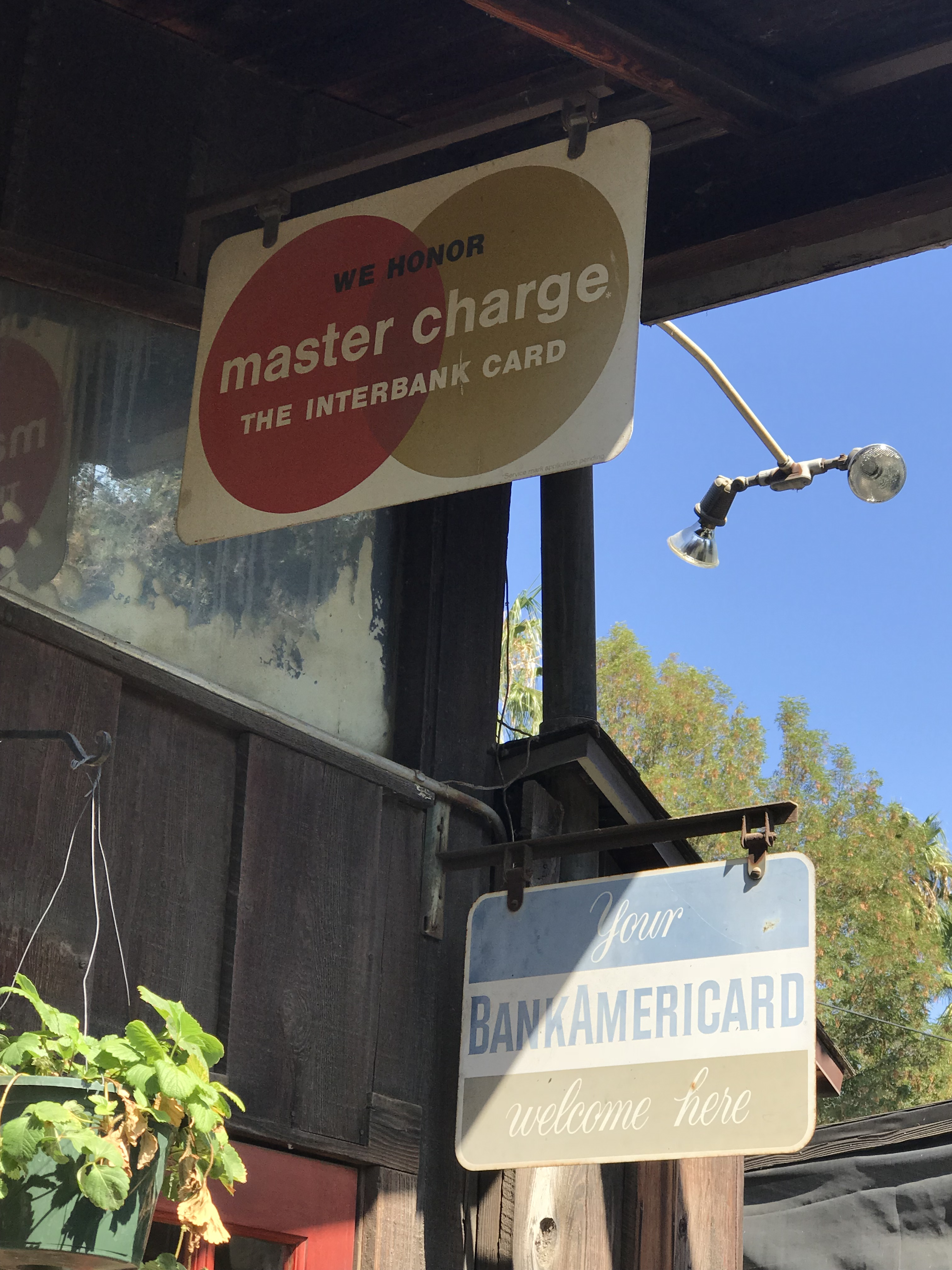
Metal signs at a plant nursery in Los Angeles County, California, marketing Master Charge and BankAmericard

Until 1958, no company or organization could successfully establish a revolving credit financial system in which a card issued by a third-party bank was generally accepted by a large number of merchants. All previous charge cards were issued by merchants, not banks, and were only accepted by a limited number of merchants by agreement. In 1958, Bank of America launched the BankAmericard in Fresno, California, which became the first successful program recognizable as a modern credit card. This card solved a problem: consumers did not want to use a card that few merchants would accept, and merchants did not want to accept a card that few consumers used. Bank of America chose Fresno because 45% of the city's residents used the bank, and by sending a card to 60,000 Fresno residents simultaneously, the bank could convince merchants to accept the card. The card was eventually licensed to other banks around the United States and then around the world. In 1976, all BankAmericard licensees unified themselves under the common brand Visa. In 1966, the ancestor of MasterCard was created when a group of banks established Master Charge to compete with BankAmericard; Master Charge received a significant boost when Citibank merged its own Everything Card (launched in 1967) into Master Charge in 1969.

Early credit cards in the US were mass-produced and mass-mailed, unsolicited, to bank customers who were deemed to be low risk. However, according to Life magazine, cards were "mailed off to unemployable people, drunks, narcotics addicts and to compulsive debtors", which Betty Furness, President Johnson's Special Assistant, compared to "giving sugar to diabetics." These mass mailings were known as "drops" in banking terminology, and they were outlawed in 1970 due to the financial chaos they caused. However, by the time this law came into effect, approximately 100 million credit cards had been dropped into the US population. After 1970, only applications for credit cards could be sent unsolicited in mass mailings.

This system was computerized in 1973 under the leadership of Dee Hock, the first CEO of Visa, allowing reduced transaction time. However, until always-connected payment terminals became ubiquitous at the beginning of the 21st century, many merchants accepted all charges, especially those below a threshold value—or from known and trusted customers—without verifying the charges by phone. Books with lists of stolen card numbers were distributed to merchants who were expected, in any case, to take two actions: check cards against the lists before accepting them, and verify the signature on the charge slip against the one on the card. Merchants who failed to follow proper verification procedures were liable for fraudulent charges, but because the procedures were cumbersome, merchants often skipped some or all of them, and they assumed the risk for smaller transactions.

In the US, the early credit card industry was characterized by regional monopolies. Several landmark antitrust court cases, including the 1978 Supreme Court case Marquette National Bank of Minneapolis v. First of Omaha Service Corp., led to substantial reforms that made the credit card industry more competitive. A 2024 study estimated that these competitive reforms resulted in significant gains for consumers, particularly the poor.

=== Development outside North America ===
In 1966, the United Kingdom's Barclays Bank launched Barclaycard, the first credit card outside the United States. There are now countless variations on the basic concept of revolving credit for individuals—as issued by banks and honored by a network of financial institutions—including organization-branded credit cards, corporate-user credit cards, and store cards.

During the late 20th century, credit cards reached very high adoption levels in several countries: the United States, Canada, the United Kingdom, Australia, and New Zealand. However, many cultures were more cash-oriented or developed alternative forms of cashless payment, such as Carte Bleue or the Eurocard (in Germany, France, Switzerland, and other countries). In these places, adoption of credit cards was initially much slower. Due to strict regulations on bank overdrafts, some countries were much quicker to develop and adopt chip-based credit cards, which are regarded as major anti-fraud credit devices.

Debit cards, online banking, ATMs, mobile banking, and installment plans are used more widely than credit cards in some countries. Global credit card usage did not catch up to levels in the United States, Canada, and the United Kingdom until the 1990s. Because of differences between national banking systems, credit card usage is still low in some areas. For example, Japan is still a cash-oriented society, with credit card adoption limited mainly to the largest merchants.

=== Vintage credit cards as collectibles ===
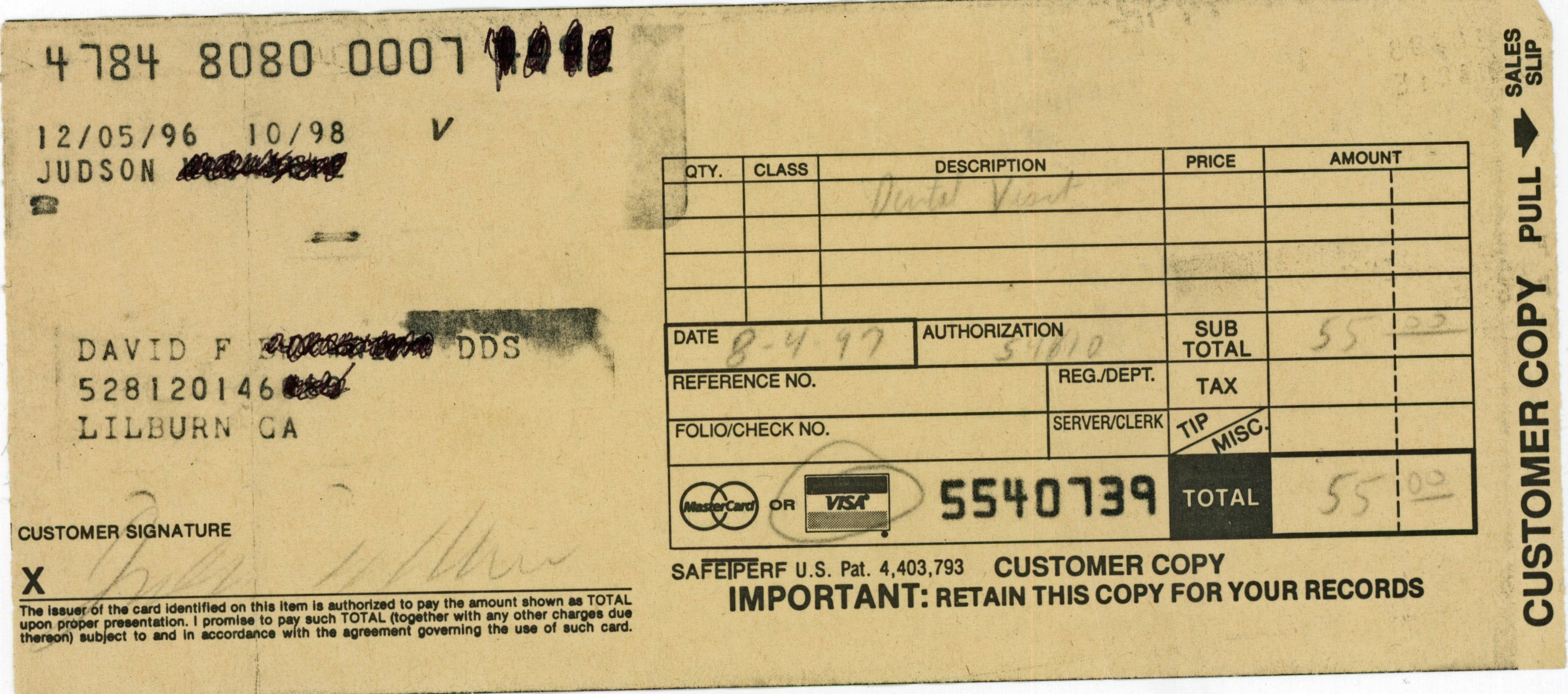
A receipt from 1997—the card was physically swiped, and information was imprinted on the receipt

The physical design of the credit card has become a major selling point. Credit card collectors seek various embodiments of credit—from newer plastic cards to older paper merchant cards, and even metal tokens that were once accepted as merchant credit cards.

== Cash advance ==
A cash advance is a credit card transaction that withdraws cash rather than purchasing a good or service. The process can occur through an ATM, or it can occur over the counter at a bank or other financial agency, up to a certain limit; for a credit card, this will be the credit limit (or a percentage of it). Cash advances often incur a fee of 3–5% of the amount borrowed. When done through a credit card, the interest is often higher than on other credit card transactions. The interest compounds daily starting from when the cash is borrowed.

Credit card purchases of items viewed as cash are sometimes deemed cash advances in accordance with the guidelines of the credit card network, thereby incurring a higher interest rate with no grace period. These purchases often include money orders, prepaid debit cards, lottery tickets, gaming chips, mobile payments, and certain taxes and fees paid to governments. However, if a merchant does not disclose the nature of a transaction, it will be processed as a normal credit card transaction. Many merchants have passed credit card processing fees on to cardholders despite a credit card network's guidelines, which state that cardholders should incur no extra fee for performing a transaction with a credit card.

Under card scheme rules, a credit card holder requesting a cash advance and presenting an accepted form of identification must be issued a cash advance over the counter at any bank that issues that type of credit card, even if the cardholder cannot provide their personal identification number (PIN).

A Japanese law enabling cash back from a credit card came into force in 2010. However, a legal loophole in this system was quickly exploited by online shops dedicated to providing cash back as a form of easy loan with exorbitant rates. At first, the online store sold a single inexpensive item—such as a glass marble, a golf tee, or an eraser—with an ¥80,000 wire transfer for a ¥100,000 (US$1,200) credit card payment. A month later, when the credit card provider charged the card owner the full fee, the online store was out of the picture with no liability. In effect, the online cashback services provided loans with a 300% annual interest rate. On 19 October 2010, Hideki Fukuba became the first operator of such an online cashback service to be charged by the police. He was charged with tax evasion of ¥40 million in unpaid taxes.

== Usage ==
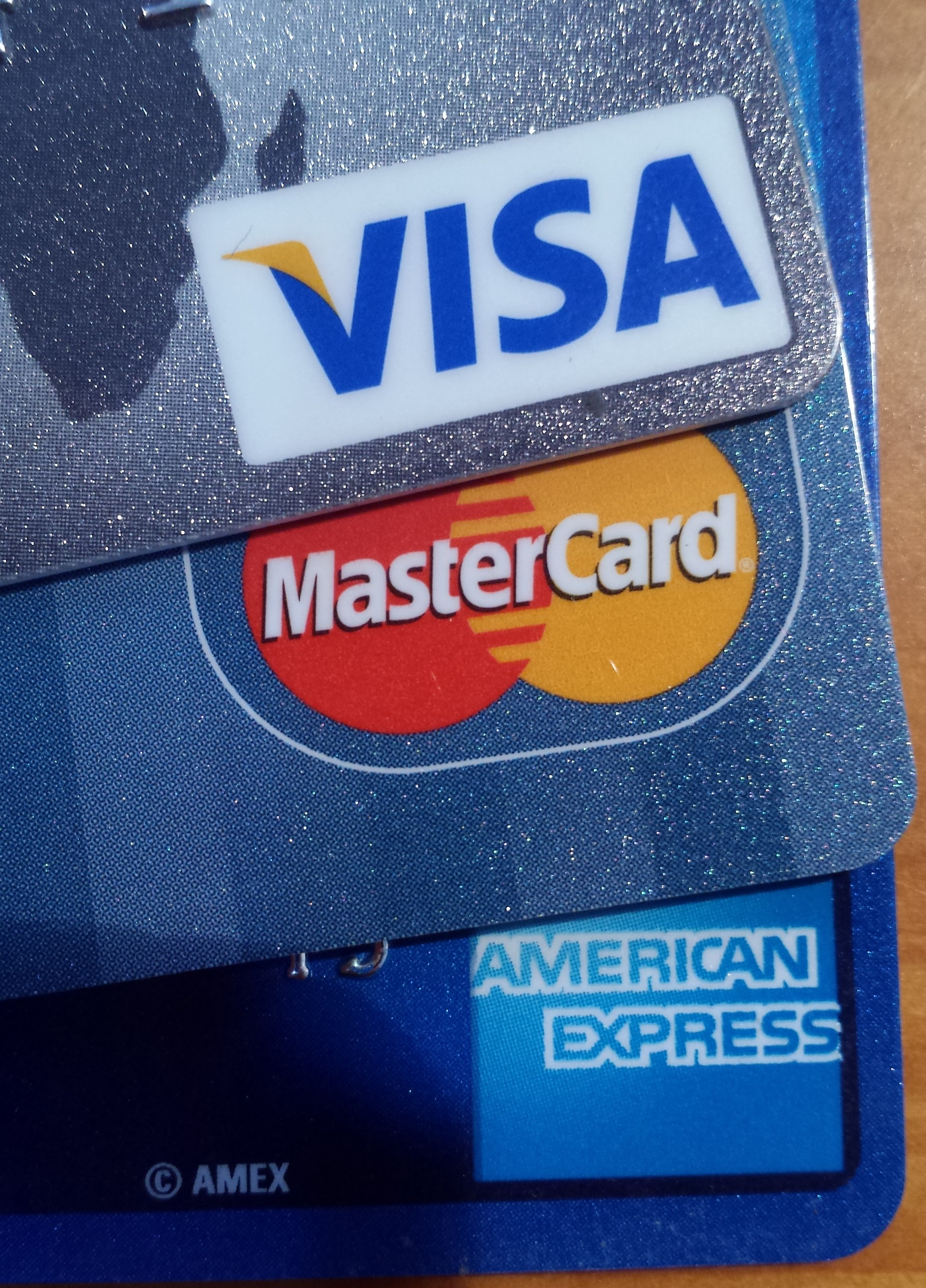
Visa, MasterCard, and American Express are card-issuing entities that set transaction terms for merchants, card-issuing banks, and acquiring banks.

A credit card issuer, such as a bank or a credit union, enters into agreements with merchants to accept its credit cards. Merchants often advertise with signage or other corporate material which cards they accept by displaying acceptance marks generally derived from logos. Alternatively, this information may be communicated, for example, via a restaurant's menu or orally (e.g., by saying, "We don't take credit cards").

The credit card issuer provides a card to a customer at the time or after an account has been approved by the credit provider, which need not be the same entity as the card issuer. Cardholders can then use the card to make purchases at merchants accepting it. When a purchase is made, the cardholder agrees to pay the card issuer. The cardholder indicates consent to pay by signing a receipt with a record of the card details and indicating the amount to be paid, or alternatively by entering a PIN. In addition, many merchants accept verbal authorization by telephone or electronic authorization via the Internet, which is known as a card-not-present transaction.

Electronic verification systems allow merchants to confirm in a few seconds that a card is valid and the cardholder has sufficient credit to cover a purchase, allowing verification to happen at purchase time. This verification is performed using a credit card payment terminal or a point-of-sale system with a communications link to the merchant's acquiring bank. Data from the card is obtained from a magnetic stripe or a chip on the card; the latter system is called chip and PIN in the United Kingdom and Ireland, and it is implemented as an EMV (Europay, Mastercard, and Visa) card.

For card-not-present transactions where the card is not shown (e.g., e-commerce, mail order, and telephone sales), merchants additionally verify that the customer is in physical possession of the card and is the authorized user; this is done by asking the customer for additional information, such as the security code on the back of the card, the card's expiry date, and the customer's billing address.

Each month, a cardholder is sent a statement indicating the purchases made with their card, any outstanding fees, the total amount owed, and the minimum payment due. In the US, after receiving a statement, the cardholder may dispute any charges thought to be incorrect (see 15 U.S.C. § 1643, which limits cardholder liability for unauthorized use of a credit card to US$50). The Fair Credit Billing Act gives details of the US regulations.

In addition, many banks offer the option of electronic statements, either instead of or in addition to physical statements, which can be viewed at any time by the cardholder via the issuer's online banking website. Notification that a new statement is available is generally sent to a cardholder's email address. If the card issuer allows it, the cardholder may have additional payment options beyond a physical check, such as an electronic funds transfer from a checking account. Depending on the issuer, a cardholder may also be able to make multiple payments during a single statement period, potentially letting the cardholder utilize a card's credit limit several times.

=== Minimum payment ===
The cardholder must pay a defined minimum portion of the amount owed by a due date, or they may choose to pay a higher amount. The credit issuer charges interest on the unpaid balance if the billed amount is not paid in full (typically at a much higher rate than most other forms of debt). These effects account for roughly 8% of all interest paid. In particular, hiding the minimum payment option for automatic and manual payments, and focusing on the total debt, may mitigate the unwanted consequences of default minimum payments. In addition, if the cardholder fails to make at least the minimum payment by the due date, the issuer may impose a late fee or other penalties. To help mitigate this risk to the consumer, some financial institutions can arrange for automatic payments to be deducted from the cardholder's bank account, thus avoiding such penalties altogether, as long as the cardholder has sufficient funds.

In cases where the minimum payment is less than the finance charges assessed during a billing cycle, the outstanding balance will increase in what is called negative amortization. This practice tends to increase credit risk and mask the lender's portfolio quality, and it has consequently been banned in the US since 2003.

=== Advertising, solicitation, application, and approval ===
US regulations on credit card advertising include the disclosure requirements for a Schumer box. A large fraction of junk mail consists of credit card offers created from lists provided by the major credit reporting agencies. In the US, the three major US credit bureaus (Equifax, TransUnion, and Experian) allow consumers to opt out of related credit card solicitation offers through the OptOutPrescreen.com website.

=== Interest charges ===
Credit card issuers usually waive interest charges if the balance is paid in full each month, but issuers typically charge full interest on the entire outstanding balance from the date of each purchase if the total balance is not paid.

For example, if a cardholder made a $1,000 transaction and repaid it in full within the grace period above, no interest would be charged. If, however, even $1 of the total amount remained unpaid, interest would be charged on the $1,000 from the date of purchase until the payment is received. The precise manner in which interest is charged is usually detailed in a cardholder agreement, which may be summarized on the back of the monthly statement. The general calculation formula that most financial institutions use to determine the amount of interest to charge includes three quantities: the annual percentage rate (APR), the average daily balance (ADB), and the total number of days the amount revolved before payment was made on the account. This formula is as follows: (APR/100 × ADB)/365 × number of days revolved. Financial institutions use the term residual retail finance charge (RRFC) for interest charged back to the original time of the transaction and up to the time a payment was made, if not in full. Thus, after an amount has revolved and a payment has been made, the user of the card will still receive interest charges on their statement after paying the next statement in full. (In fact, the statement may contain only an interest charge that was collected up until the date that the full balance was paid, i.e., when the balance stopped revolving.)

The credit card may simply serve as a form of revolving credit—or it may become a complicated financial instrument with multiple balance segments, each at a different interest rate, possibly with a single umbrella credit limit, or with separate credit limits applicable to the various balance segments. Usually, this compartmentalization is the result of special incentive offers from the issuing bank to encourage balance transfers from the cards of other issuers. If several interest rates apply to various balance segments, then payment allocation is generally at the discretion of the issuing bank, and therefore payments will usually be allocated toward the lowest rate balances until these are paid in full, before any money is paid toward higher rate balances. Interest rates can vary considerably between cards, and the interest rate on a particular card may jump dramatically if the cardholder is late with a payment on that card or any other credit instrument, or even if the issuing bank decides to increase its revenue.

=== Grace period ===
A credit card's grace period is the time a cardholder has to pay their balance before interest is assessed on the outstanding balance. Grace periods may vary, but they usually range from 20 to 55 days, depending on the type of credit card and the issuing bank. Some policies allow for reinstatement after certain conditions are met. Usually, if a cardholder is late in paying the balance, finance charges will be calculated, and the grace period does not apply. Finance charges incurred depend on the grace period and the balance; with most credit cards, there is no grace period if there is any outstanding balance from the previous billing cycle or statement (i.e., interest is applied on both the previous balance and new transactions). However, some credit cards will only apply finance charges to the previous or old balance, excluding new transactions.

=== Parties involved ===
- Cardholder: The holder of the card used to make a purchase; the consumer. Does not pay fraudulent charges on US credit cards.
- Card-issuing bank: The financial institution or other organization that issued the credit card to the cardholder. This bank bills the consumer for repayment and bears the risk that the card is used fraudulently. American Express and Discover were previously the only card-issuing banks for their respective brands, but as of 2007, this is no longer the case. Cards issued by banks to cardholders in another country are known as offshore credit cards. In the US, credit card issuers are not required to inform cardholders when they close any credit card account, including accounts with balances.
- Merchant: The individual or business accepting credit card payments for products or services sold to the cardholder.
- Acquiring bank: The financial institution accepting payment for products or services on behalf of the merchant.
- Independent sales organization: Resellers (to merchants) of the services of the acquiring bank.
- Merchant account: Possibly the acquiring bank or the independent sales organization, but generally the organization with whom the merchant deals.
- Card association: An association of card-issuing banks—such as Discover, Visa, MasterCard, and American Express—that sets transaction terms for merchants, card-issuing banks, and acquiring banks.
- Transaction network: The system that implements the mechanics of electronic transactions. It may be operated by an independent company, and one company may operate multiple networks.
- Affinity partner: Some institutions lend their names to an issuer to attract customers who have a strong relationship with that institution, and they are paid a fee or a percentage of the balance for each card issued using their name. Examples of typical affinity partners are sports teams, universities, charities, professional organizations, and major retailers.
- Insurance providers: Insurers underwriting various insurance protections offered as credit card perks; for example, car rental insurance, purchase security, hotel burglary insurance, and travel medical protection.

The flow of information and money between these parties—always through card associations—is known as interchange, and it consists of several steps (as described below).

=== Transaction steps ===
- Authorization: The cardholder presents the card as payment to the merchant, and the merchant submits the transaction to the acquirer (the acquiring bank). The acquirer verifies the credit card number, the transaction type, and the amount with the issuer (the card-issuing bank) and reserves that amount of the cardholder's credit limit for the merchant. An authorization generates an approval code, which the merchant stores with this transaction.
- Batching: Authorized transactions are stored in batches, which are sent to the acquirer. Batches are typically submitted at the end of each business day. Batching can be done manually (as initiated by a merchant's action) or automatically (on a predetermined schedule, using a payment processing platform). If a transaction is not submitted in the batch, the authorization will remain valid for a period determined by the issuer, after which the held amount will be returned to the cardholder's available credit (see authorization hold). Some transactions may be submitted in the batch without prior authorizations; these are either transactions falling below the merchant's floor limit or ones where authorization failed but the merchant still attempts to force the transaction through. (This case may arise when a cardholder is absent but owes the merchant additional money, such as for extending a hotel stay or a car rental.)
- Clearing and settlement: The acquirer sends the batch transactions through the credit card association, which debits the issuers for payment and credits the acquirer. Essentially, the issuer pays the acquirer for the transaction.
- Funding: Once the acquirer has been paid, the acquirer pays the merchant. The merchant receives the amount totaling the funds in the batch minus the discount rate, mid-qualified rate, or non-qualified rate; these are tiers of fees that the merchant pays the acquirer for processing the transactions.
- Chargebacks: A chargeback is an event in which money in a merchant account is held due to a dispute relating to the transaction. Chargebacks are typically initiated by the cardholder. In the event of a chargeback, the issuer returns the transaction to the acquirer for resolution. The acquirer then forwards the chargeback to the merchant, who must either accept the chargeback or contest it.

=== Credit card register ===
A credit card register is a transaction register used for two purposes: first, to ensure that the increasing balance owed from using a credit card is sufficiently below the credit limit to deal with authorization holds and payments not yet received by the bank; second, to easily look up past transactions for reconciliation and budgeting.

The credit card register is a personal record of banking transactions used for credit card purchases as they affect funds in the bank account or the available credit. In addition to checking numbers and so forth, the code column indicates the credit card. The balance column shows available funds after purchases. When the credit card payment is made, the balance already reflects that the funds were spent. In a credit card's entry, the deposit column shows the available credit, and the payment column shows the total owed, their sum being equal to the credit limit.

Each check written, debit card transaction, cash withdrawal, and credit card charge is entered manually into a paper register daily or several times per week. Credit card register also refers to one transaction record for each credit card. In this case, booklets enable the easy location of a card's currently available credit when ten or more cards are in use.

== Specialized types ==
=== Business credit cards ===
Business credit cards are specialized credit cards issued in the name of a registered business, and they can typically be used only for business purposes. Use of these cards has increased in recent decades. In 1998, for instance, 37% of small businesses reported using a business credit card; by 2009, this share had increased to 64%.

Business credit cards offer several distinctive features. These cards frequently offer special rewards in areas such as shipping, office supplies, travel, and business technology. Most issuers use an applicant's personal credit score when evaluating applications for these cards. In addition, income from a variety of sources may be used to qualify applicants, which means these cards may be available to new businesses. Moreover, some issuers of these cards do not report account activity to the owner's personal credit file, or do so only if the account is delinquent. In such cases, the business activity is separated from the owner's personal credit activity.

Business credit cards are offered by American Express, Discover, and almost all major issuers of Visa and MasterCard cards. Some local banks and credit unions also offer business credit cards.

=== Secured credit cards ===
A secured credit card is a type of credit card that is secured by a deposit account owned by the cardholder. Typically, the cardholder must deposit between 100% and 200% of the total amount of credit desired. For example, if a cardholder deposits $1,000, they will receive credit in the range of $500–1,000. In some cases, credit card issuers offer incentives even on their secured card portfolios. In such cases, the required deposit may be significantly less than the required credit limit, and this deposit can be as low as 10% of the desired credit limit. The deposit is held in a special savings account. Credit card issuers offer this option because they observed that delinquencies were notably reduced when the customer perceived a potential loss if the balance was not repaid.

The holder of a secured credit card must still make regular payments, as with a normal credit card; but if the cardholder defaults on a payment, the card issuer has the option of recovering the cost of purchases paid to merchants out of the security deposit. For a person with negative or no credit history, the advantage of a secured card is that most companies report regularly to the major credit bureaus. This allows the cardholder to start building (or rebuilding) a positive credit history.

Although a deposit is held by the credit card issuer as security in the event of default by the consumer, the deposit will not be debited solely for missing one or two payments. Usually, a deposit is used as an offset only when the account is closed, either at the request of the customer or due to severe delinquency (150 to 180 days). This policy means that an account that is less than 150 days delinquent will continue to accrue interest and fees, and it could result in a balance that is much higher than the actual credit limit on the card. In these cases, the total debt may far exceed the original deposit, and the cardholder not only forfeits their deposit but is left with additional debt.

Most of these conditions are typically described in a cardholder agreement, which the cardholder signs when opening an account.

Secured credit cards allow a person with a poor credit history or no credit history to have a credit card that might otherwise be unavailable. These cards are often offered as a way to rebuild one's credit. Fees and service charges for secured credit cards often exceed those charged for ordinary unsecured credit cards. For people in certain situations—for example, after charging off on other credit cards, or having a long history of delinquency with various forms of debt—secured cards are almost always more expensive than unsecured credit cards.

Sometimes a credit card will be secured by equity in the borrower's home.

=== Prepaid cards ===
A prepaid card is sometimes called a "prepaid credit card", but it is a debit card (i.e., a prepaid card or a prepaid debit card), since no credit is offered by the card issuer: instead, the cardholder spends money that has been stored via a prior deposit by the cardholder or another person. However, the prepaid card carries a credit card brand (such as Discover, Visa, MasterCard, American Express, or JCB) and can be used in similar ways, just as though it were a credit card. Unlike debit cards, prepaid credit cards generally do not require a PIN. An exception is a prepaid credit card with an EMV chip, which requires a PIN if the payment is processed via chip and PIN technology. As of 2018, most debit cards in the US were prepaid cards (71.7%).

After purchasing a card, the cardholder loads the account with any amount of money (up to the predetermined card limit) and then uses the card to make purchases as with a typical credit card. The main advantage over secured credit cards is that the cardholder is not required to supply the money needed to open an account. With prepaid credit cards, purchasers are not charged any interest, but they are often charged a purchasing fee plus monthly fees after an arbitrary time period, along with many other fees.

Prepaid credit cards are sometimes marketed to teenagers for shopping online without involving their parents to complete a transaction. Teenagers can only use funds that are available on the card, which helps promote good financial management to reduce the risk of debt problems later in life.

Prepaid cards can be used globally. A prepaid card is convenient for payees in countries where international wire transfers and bank checks are time-consuming, complicated, and costly.

Because many fees apply when obtaining and using credit-card-branded prepaid cards, the Financial Consumer Agency of Canada describes these cards as "an expensive way to spend your own money". The agency publishes a booklet entitled Pre-paid Cards, which explains the advantages and disadvantages of this type of prepaid card.

=== Digital cards ===
A digital card is a cloud-hosted virtual representation of any type of identification card or payment card, such as a credit card.

=== Charge cards ===
A charge card is a type of payment card that requires the balance to be repaid in full each month, unlike a standard credit card.

== Benefits and drawbacks ==
=== Benefits to cardholders ===
The main benefit to a credit card holder is convenience. Compared to debit cards and checks, a credit card allows small short-term loans to be quickly made to a cardholder, who need not calculate the balance remaining before each transaction, provided that the total charges do not exceed the maximum credit line for the card. One financial benefit is this: no interest is charged when the balance is paid in full within the grace period. In the US, most credit cards offer a grace period (e.g., 21, 23, or 25 days) on purchase transactions. Different countries offer different levels of protection. In the UK, for example, the bank is jointly liable with the merchant for purchases of defective products costing more than £100. Many credit cards offer benefits to cardholders. Some benefits apply to products purchased with the card, such as extended product warranties; reimbursement for decreases in price immediately after purchase (i.e., price protection); and reimbursement for theft or damage on recently purchased products (i.e., purchase protection). Other benefits include various types of travel insurance, such as rental car insurance, travel accident insurance, baggage delay insurance, and trip delay or cancellation insurance.

Credit cards may also offer a loyalty program, where each purchase is rewarded on the basis of the purchase price. Typically, rewards are in the form of either cashback or points. Points are often redeemable for gift cards, products, or travel expenses such as airline tickets. Some credit cards allow the transfer of accrued points to hotel and airline loyalty programs. Research has examined whether competition among card networks may potentially make payment rewards too generous, causing higher prices among merchants—thereby actually impacting social welfare and its distribution, a situation potentially warranting public policy interventions.

In the United States, federal law generally limits a cardholder's liability for unauthorized use to the lesser of $50 or the amount obtained before the issuer is notified.

==== Comparison of credit card benefits in the US ====
The table below lists the benefits offered in the US for consumer credit cards in some card networks. The benefits may vary with each credit card issuer.

Benefit	MasterCard	Visa	American Express	Discover
Return extension	60 days up to $250	90 days up to $250	90 days up to $300	Not available
Extended warranty	2× original up to 1 year	Depends	1 additional year 6 years max	Not available
Price protection	60 days	Varies	Not available	Not available
Loss or damage coverage	90 days	Depends	90 days up to $1,000	Not available
Rental car damage waiver	15 days: collision, theft, vandalism	15 days: collision, theft	30 days: collision, theft, vandalism	Not available

=== Detriments to cardholders ===
==== High interest and bankruptcy ====
Low introductory credit card rates are limited to a fixed term, usually between 6 and 12 months; after this, a higher rate is charged. As all credit cards charge fees and interest, some customers become so indebted to their credit card provider that they are driven to bankruptcy. Some credit cards levy a rate of 20–30% after a payment is missed. In other cases, a fixed charge is levied without change to the interest rate. In some cases, universal default may apply: the high default rate is applied to a card in good standing by missing a payment on an unrelated account from the same provider. This situation can lead to a snowball effect in which the consumer is drowned by unexpectedly high interest rates. Furthermore, most cardholder agreements enable the issuer to arbitrarily raise the interest rate for any reason. At one point, First Premier Bank offered a credit card with a 79.9% interest rate; however, the bank discontinued this card in February 2011 because of persistent defaults.

Research shows that a substantial fraction of consumers (about 40%) choose a suboptimal credit card agreement, with some incurring hundreds of dollars in avoidable interest costs.

Interest rates on credit cards are high because they represent unsecured debt. Unlike a loan with collateral, in the event of nonpayment, the lender loses the entire outstanding amount. In 2026, the average interest rate on U.S. credit card balances that accrued interest was over 22%

Some jurisdictions place a limit on credit card interest rates; charging excessive interest is known as usury. In the US, the ability of states to enforce usury laws for their residents was limited by the 1978 Supreme Court decision Marquette National Bank of Minneapolis v. First of Omaha Service Corp., which held that nationally chartered banks could only be regulated by the federal government and the state in which they were chartered. This case enabled lenders to choose the states with the most favorable regulations. The 1996 decision Smiley v. Citibank (South Dakota), N. A. extended this doctrine to fees. Capping the allowed interest rate limited the availability of card loans to more creditworthy consumers, since the risk of default by less trusted (subprime) consumers could only be offset by high interest rates or fees. The Marquette decision caused higher-interest cards to become widely available and greatly increased the use of credit cards in the country, often with cards issued in the low-regulation states of South Dakota and Delaware.

==== Unnecessary risk ====
Credit card ownership carries additional risks (compared to other cashless payment alternatives), such as increased risk of fraud or taking on unnecessary liability.

==== Weakened self-regulation ====
Several studies have shown that consumers are likely to spend more money when they pay by credit card. Researchers suggest that when people pay using credit cards, they do not experience the abstract pain of payment. Furthermore, researchers have found that using credit cards can increase consumption of unhealthy food, compared to using cash.

=== Detriments to society ===
==== Inflated pricing for all consumers ====
Merchants that accept credit cards must pay interchange fees and discount fees on all credit card transactions. In some cases, merchants are barred by their credit agreements from two practices: passing these fees directly to credit card customers and setting a minimum transaction amount. As a result, merchants are induced to charge all customers (including those who do not use credit cards) higher prices to cover the fees on credit card transactions. The inducement can be strong because the merchant's fee is a percentage of the sale price; this has a disproportionate effect on the profitability of businesses that have mainly credit card transactions, unless compensated for by raising prices generally. In the US in 2008, credit card companies collected a total of $48 billion in interchange fees, or an average of $427 per family, with an average fee rate of about 2% per transaction.

Credit card rewards result in a total transfer of $1,282 from the average cash payer to the average card payer per year.

=== Benefits to merchants ===
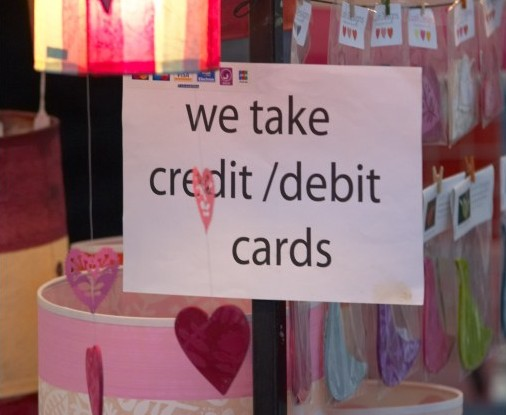
An example of street markets accepting credit cards. Most markets simply display the acceptance marks (stylized logos, as shown in the upper-left corner of the sign) of all cards that they accept.

For merchants, card-based purchase amounts reduce consumer resistance relative to paying cash, and the transaction is often more secure than other forms of payment (such as checks) because the issuing bank commits to paying the merchant as soon as the transaction is authorized—regardless of whether the consumer defaults on the credit card payment later (except for legitimate disputes, which can result in charges back to the merchant). Cards are even more secure than cash: they reduce theft opportunities by reducing the amount of cash on the merchant's premises. Finally, credit cards reduce the back office expense of processing checks/cash and transporting these to the bank.

Before credit cards, each merchant needed to evaluate each customer's credit history before extending credit. That task is now performed by banks, which assume the credit risk. Extra turnover is generated because a customer can purchase goods and services immediately, without being inhibited by the amount of cash in their pocket or the immediate state of their bank balance. Much of merchants' marketing is based on this immediacy. For each purchase, the bank charges the merchant a service commission (a discount fee), and there may be some delay before the agreed payment is received by the merchant. The commission is often a percentage of the transaction amount, plus a fixed fee (the interchange rate).

=== Costs to merchants ===
Merchants are charged several fees for accepting credit cards. The merchant is usually charged a commission of 0.5–4.0% of the value of each transaction paid by credit card. The merchant may also pay a variable charge, called a merchant discount rate, for each transaction. In some instances of very low-value transactions, the use of credit cards significantly reduces the profit margin or causes the merchant to lose money on the transaction. Merchants with very low average transaction prices or very high average transaction prices are more averse to accepting credit cards. In some cases, merchants may charge users a "credit card supplement" (or surcharge), either a fixed amount or a percentage, for payment by credit card. This practice was prohibited by most credit card contracts in the US until 2013, when a major settlement between merchants and credit card companies allowed merchants to levy surcharges. Most retailers have not started levying these surcharges, however, for fear of losing customers.

In a series of lawsuits that began in 2005, merchants in the US have been fighting what they consider to be unfairly high fees charged by credit card companies. Merchants alleged that the two main credit card processing companies, MasterCard and Visa, used their monopoly power to levy excessive fees in a class-action lawsuit involving the National Retail Federation and major retailers such as Wal-Mart. In December 2013, a federal judge approved a $5.7 billion settlement in this case, which offered payouts to merchants who had paid credit card fees—the largest antitrust settlement in US history. Some large retailers, such as Wal-Mart and Amazon, did not participate in this settlement, however, and have continued their legal fight against the credit card companies.

In April 2015, the EU imposed an interchange fee cap of 0.3% for consumer credit cards and 0.2% for debit cards.

Merchants must also lease or purchase processing equipment, although some payment processors provide this equipment free of charge. In addition, merchants must satisfy data-security compliance standards that are highly technical and complex. In many cases, a delay of several days occurs before funds are deposited into a merchant's bank account. Because credit-card fee structures are complicated, smaller merchants are at a disadvantage in analyzing and predicting fees.

Finally, merchants assume the risk of chargebacks by consumers.

== Technical specifications ==
The front of a typical credit card includes the following: 1. Issuing bank logo; 2. EMV chip (only on smart cards); 3. Hologram; 4. Card number; 5. Card network logo; 6. Expiration date; 7. Cardholder name; 8. EMV contactless indicator

The back of a typical credit card includes the following: 1. Magnetic stripe; 2. Signature strip; 3. Card security code

Most credit cards have a size of 85.60 by 53.98 millimeters (3 3/8 in × 2 1/8 in), with rounded corners having a radius of 2.88–3.48 millimeters (9/80–11/80 in) conforming to the ISO/IEC 7810 ID-1 standard; this is the same size as ATM cards and other payment cards, such as debit card. Most credit cards are made of plastic, but some are made of metal.

Credit cards have a printed or embossed bank card number complying with the ISO/IEC 7812 numbering standard. The card number's prefix, called the Bank Identification Number (known in the industry as a BIN), is the sequence of digits at the beginning of the card number that determines the bank to which a credit card belongs. This prefix is the first six digits on MasterCard and Visa cards. The next nine digits are the individual account number, and the final digit is for a validity check.

Both of these ISO/IEC standards are maintained and further developed by the ISO/IEC JTC 1/SC 17/WG 1 working group. Credit cards have a magnetic stripe conforming to the ISO/IEC 7813 standard. Most modern credit cards use smart card technology: they have an embedded computer chip as a security feature. In addition, complex smart cards—including peripherals such as a keypad, a display, and a fingerprint sensor—are increasingly used for credit cards.

In addition to the main credit card number, credit cards also carry dates of issue and expiration (given to the nearest month), as well as extra codes such as issue numbers and security codes. Complex smart cards allow for a variable security code, thereby increasing security for online transactions. Not all credit cards have the same sets of extra codes, nor do they use the same number of digits.

Credit card numbers and cardholder names were originally embossed to allow for easy transfer of this information to charge slips printed on carbon paper forms. With the decline of paper slips, some credit cards are no longer embossed, and the card number is no longer on the front. In addition, some cards are now vertical in design, rather than horizontal.

== Security ==
Credit card security relies on the physical security of the plastic card, as well as the privacy of the credit card number. Therefore, whenever a person other than the card owner has access to the card or its number, security is potentially compromised. Previously, merchants often accepted credit card numbers without additional verification for mail order purchases. It is now common practice to ship only to confirmed addresses, as a security measure to minimize fraudulent purchases. Some merchants accept a credit card number for in-store purchases, whereupon access to this number allows easy fraud, but many merchants require the card to be present and require a signature (for magnetic stripe cards). A lost or stolen card can be cancelled; if this is done quickly, it significantly limits the resulting potential fraud. European banks can require the cardholder's security PIN to be entered for in-person purchases with a card.

The Payment Card Industry Data Security Standard (PCI DSS) is the standard issued by the Payment Card Industry Security Standards Council (PCI SSC). This standard is used by acquiring banks to impose cardholder data-security measures upon their merchants.

The goal of credit card companies is not to eliminate fraud, but to "reduce it to manageable levels". This goal implies that fraud prevention measures will be used only if their cost is lower than the potential gains from fraud reduction, whereas high-cost, low-return measures will not be used—as expected from organizations whose goal is profit maximization.

Internet fraud may be committed by claiming an unjustified chargeback ("friendly fraud"), or by using credit card information that can be stolen in many ways, the simplest being copying information from retailers (either online or offline). Despite efforts to improve security for remote purchases using credit cards, security breaches are usually the result of poor practice by merchants. For example, a website that safely uses the TLS protocol to encrypt card data from a client may then email this data unencrypted from the web server to the merchant; or the merchant may store unencrypted details in such a way that they can be accessed via the Internet or by a rogue employee. Unencrypted card details are always a security risk—even encrypted data may be cracked.

Controlled payment numbers (also known as virtual credit cards or disposable credit cards) are another option for protecting against credit card fraud; these numbers can be used where the presentation of a physical card is not required, as in telephone and online purchasing. These one-time-use numbers function as a payment card and are linked to the user's real account, but they do not reveal details and cannot be used for subsequent unauthorized transactions. These numbers can be valid for a relatively short time, and they can be limited to the actual purchase amount or a limit set by the user. Their use can be limited to one merchant. If the number given to a merchant is compromised, it will be rejected if an attempt is made to use it a second time.

A similar system of controls can be used on physical cards. Banks can adjust many controls on individual cards as needed; for example, a card can be subjected to temporal, numerical, and geographical restrictions on use. From a security perspective, these restrictions imply that a customer can have a chip-and-PIN card secured for the real world and limited to use in the customer's home country. If card details are compromised, the thief is prevented from using them abroad in EMV countries that do not use chip-and-PIN technology. Similarly, the authentic card can be restricted from online use, so that stolen card details will be declined if this is attempted. Then, when cardholders shop online, they can use virtual account numbers. In both circumstances, an alert system can be built to notify a user that a fraudulent attempt has been made that breaches their security parameters, and it can provide data on this attempt in real-time.

Additionally, the physical card includes security features to prevent counterfeiting. For example, most modern credit cards have a watermark that fluoresces under ultraviolet light. Most major credit cards also include a hologram. In addition, a Visa card has the letter V superimposed over the Visa logo, and a MasterCard has the letters 'MC' across the front of the card. Older Visa cards show a bald eagle or a dove across the front, while older MasterCard cards show two circles (a Venn diagram) with continents on them. In all of these cases, the security features are visible only under ultraviolet light and remain invisible in normal light.

In the US, the Department of Justice, the Secret Service, the Federal Bureau of Investigation, the Immigration and Customs Enforcement agency, and the Postal Inspection Service are responsible for prosecuting criminals who engage in credit card fraud. However, these organizations lack the resources to pursue all criminals, so they generally prosecute only cases exceeding $5,000.

Three improvements to card security have been introduced to the more common credit card networks, but none has proved to help reduce credit card fraud to date. First, physical cards are being replaced by similar-looking tamper-resistant smart cards intended to make forgery more difficult. The majority of credit cards that are based on smart cards (integrated circuit [IC] cards) comply with the EMV standard. Second, an additional three- or four-digit card security code (CSC) or card verification value (CVV) is present on the back of most cards, for use in card-not-present transactions. Stakeholders at all levels in electronic payment have recognized the need to develop consistent global standards for security that account for and integrate both current and emerging security technologies. These stakeholders have begun to address the needs through organizations such as PCI DSS and the Secure POS Vendor Alliance.

=== Code 10 ===
Code 10 calls are made when merchants are suspicious about accepting a credit card. The operator then asks the merchant a series of yes-or-no questions to determine whether the merchant suspects the card or the cardholder. The merchant may be asked to retain the card if safely possible. The merchant may receive a reward for returning a confiscated card to the issuing bank, especially if an arrest is made.

== Costs and revenues of credit card issuers ==
=== Costs ===
- Charge-offs: When a cardholder becomes severely delinquent with a debt, the creditor may declare the debt to be a charge-off. It will then be listed as such on the debtor's reports from credit bureaus. (Equifax, for instance, lists "R9" in the Status column to denote a charge-off.) A charge-off is considered to be "written off as uncollectible". To banks, bad debts and fraud are part of the cost of doing business. However, the debt is still legally valid, and the creditor can attempt to collect the full amount for the time periods permitted by law. Such attempts include contact by internal collections staff or, more likely, an outside collection agency. If the amount is sufficiently large, a lawsuit or arbitration is possible.
- Fraud: In relative terms, the amounts lost in bank card fraud are minor, calculated in 2006 at 7¢ per $100 worth of transactions (i.e., 7 basis points). In 2004, in the UK, the cost of fraud was over £500 million. When a card is stolen or an unauthorized duplicate is made, most card issuers refund some or all charges that the customer has incurred for goods or services that they did not buy. In some cases, these refunds are at the merchant's expense, especially in mail order cases where the merchant cannot claim sight of the card. In several countries, merchants lose money if no identification card is requested from a customer; therefore, merchants usually require identification cards in these countries. Credit card companies generally guarantee that the merchant is paid on legitimate transactions, regardless of whether the consumer pays their credit card bill.
  Most banking services have their own credit card services to handle fraud cases and to monitor for possible fraud attempts. Employees specialized in fraud monitoring and investigation are often placed in areas such as Risk Management, Fraud and Authorization, or Cards and Unsecured Business. Fraud monitoring emphasizes minimizing fraud losses while attempting to track down the responsible parties and contain the situation. Credit card fraud is a major white-collar crime that has existed for many decades, even with the arrival of the chip-based card (EMV) that was introduced in some countries to prevent such cases. Even after the implementation of such measures, credit card fraud continues to be a problem.
- Interest expenses: Banks generally borrow the money that they then lend to their customers. Because banks receive low-interest loans from other firms, they may borrow as much as their customers require, while lending their capital to other borrowers at higher rates. For example, if a card issuer charges 15% on money lent to cardholders, and it costs 5% to borrow the money for lending, and the balance is carried by the cardholder for a year, the issuer earns 10% on this loan. This 10% difference is the net interest spread, and the 5% cost is the interest expense.
- Operating costs: The cost of running the credit card portfolio includes many expenses: paying company executives, printing card plastics, mailing customer statements, running computers to track each cardholder's balance, handling the many phone calls from cardholders to their issuer, and protecting customers from fraud rings. Depending on the issuer, marketing programs can also be a significant share of expenses.
- Rewards (programs): Issuers incur costs for cashback reward programs.

=== Revenues ===
==== Interchange fee ====
In addition to fees paid by a cardholder, merchants must also pay interchange fees to the card-issuing bank and the card association. For a typical credit card issuer, interchange fee revenues may represent about a quarter of total revenues.

Interchange fees are typically 1–6% of each sale, but they will vary from merchant to merchant (large merchants can negotiate lower rates), and also from card to card, with business cards and rewards cards generally costing merchants more to process. The interchange fee that applies to a particular transaction is also affected by many other variables—including the type of merchant, the merchant's total card sales volume, the merchant's average transaction amount, whether the cards were physically present, how the information required for the transaction was received, the specific type of card, when the transaction was settled, and the authorized and settled transaction amounts. In some cases, merchants add a surcharge to credit cards to cover the interchange fee, encouraging their customers instead to use cash, debit cards, or even checks.

The change proposed in 2022 for interchange fees, by encouraging the use of multiple card networks, was criticized as likely to reduce fraud detection.

==== Interest on outstanding balances ====
Interest charges vary widely between card issuers. Often, "teaser" rates or promotional APRs, as low as 0%, are in effect for an initial period—for example, six months—whereas normal rates can be as high as 40%. In the US, there is no federal limit on the interest or late fees that credit card issuers can charge; interest rates are set by the states, with some states (such as South Dakota) having no ceiling on interest rates and fees, inviting some banks to establish credit card operations there. Other states (e.g., Delaware) have very weak usury laws. The teaser rate no longer applies if the customer does not pay their bills on time, and it is replaced by a penalty interest rate (e.g., 23.99%) that applies retroactively.

=== Transactors and revolvers ===
Credit card analysts tag some accounts on a continuum between transactors (who pay in full) and revolvers. The issuer needs both types of cardholders; some pay interest, and others primarily cause merchants to pay fees.

==== Revolving account ====
A revolving account is created by a financial institution to let a customer incur debt, which is charged to this account, and on which the borrower is not required to pay the outstanding balance in full every month. A borrower may be required to make a minimum payment, based on the balance amount. However, the borrower normally has the discretion to pay the lender any amount between the minimum payment and the full balance. If the balance is not paid in full by the end of a monthly billing period, the remaining balance rolls over or revolves into the following month. Interest is charged on that amount and added to the balance.

A revolving account is a type of line of credit, typically subject to a credit limit; however, not all credit cards have a credit limit. The term revolving account can also refer to a savings fund for emergencies.

== Fees charged to customers ==
The major credit card fees are for the following:

- Membership (annual or monthly), sometimes a percentage of the credit limit
- Cash advances and convenience checks (often 3% of the transaction amount)
- Charges exceeding the credit limit on the card (whether intentionally or accidentally), called over-limit fees
- Exchange rate loading (sometimes not reported on a customer's statement, even when applied). The variation between exchange rates applied by different credit cards can be substantial, as much as 10%, according to a report by the publisher Lonely Planet in 2009.
- Late or overdue payments
- Returned checks or payment processing (e.g., a phone payment fee)
- Transactions in a foreign currency (as much as 3% of the transaction amount), for which a few financial institutions charge no fee
- A finance charge is any charge that is included in the cost of borrowing money.

Some card issuers charge customers who exceed a monthly usage cap, even if they pay their balance off during the month and therefore never exceed their credit limit. Other issuers charge customers who overpay and therefore have a negative balance.

In the US, the Credit CARD Act of 2009 specifies that a credit card company must send cardholders a notice 45 days in advance of increasing or changing certain fees. These fees include annual fees, cash advance fees, and late fees.

=== Controversy ===
One controversial issue is trailing interest. This interest accrues on a balance after the monthly statement is produced, but before the balance is repaid. This additional interest is typically added to the following monthly statement. US Senator Carl Levin raised the issue of millions of Americans who are affected by hidden fees, compounding interest, and cryptic terms. Their problems were presented in a hearing of the Senate Permanent Subcommittee on Investigations; this hearing was chaired by Senator Levin, who said that he intended to keep the focus on credit card companies and that legislative action might be necessary to purge the industry. In 2009, the Credit CARD Act was signed into law, enacting protections against many of the problems that Levin had raised.

==== Hidden costs ====
Through The Credit Cards (Price Discrimination) Order 1990, UK merchants won the right to charge customers different prices according to the payment method used; this right was later removed by the EU's 2nd Payment Services Directive. As of 2007, the United Kingdom was one of the world's most credit-card-intensive countries, with 2.4 credit cards per consumer, according to UK Payments Administration Ltd.

In the US, until 1984, provisions of the federal Truth in Lending Act prohibited surcharges on card transactions. Although these provisions expired that year, some states have since enacted laws that continue to outlaw the practice; California, Colorado, Connecticut, Florida, Kansas, Massachusetts, Maine, New York, Oklahoma, and Texas have laws against surcharges. As of 2006, the US probably had one of the world's highest ratios of credit cards per capita; there were 984 million bank-issued Visa and MasterCard credit and debit card accounts for an adult population of roughly 220 million people. The US credit card per capita ratio was nearly 4:1 as of 2003 and as high as 5:1 as of 2006.

== Over-limit charges ==
=== United Kingdom ===
A consumer who keeps their account in good order—by always staying within their credit limit and always making at least their minimum monthly payment—sees interest as the largest expense from their card provider. People who are less careful, and who regularly exceed their credit limit or make payments late, were previously exposed to multiple charges; then the Office of Fair Trading ruled that it would presume charges over £12 to be unfair, which led the majority of card providers to reduce their fees to £12.

The higher fees originally charged were supposedly designed to recoup the card operator's overall business costs and ensure that the credit card business as a whole generated a profit—rather than simply recovering the cost to the provider of any credit limit breach, which has been estimated as typically between £3 and £4. Profiting from a customer's mistakes is arguably forbidden in two ways: under UK common law if the charges constitute penalties for breach of contract, or under the Unfair Terms in Consumer Contracts Regulations 1999.

Subsequent rulings regarding personal current accounts suggest that this argument—that these charges are penalties for breach of contract—is weak. Given the 1999 ruling by the Office of Fair Trading, it seems unlikely that any further test case will arise.

While the law remains in the balance, many consumers have made claims against their credit card providers for the charges that they have incurred, in addition to interest that they would have earned had the money not been deducted from their accounts. Claims for amounts charged in excess of £12 are likely to succeed, but claims for charges at the OFT's £12 threshold level are more contentious.

=== United States ===
The Credit CARD Act of 2009 requires that consumers opt in to over-limit charges. Some card issuers have therefore begun solicitations requesting customers to opt into such charges, presenting this option as a benefit, because it may avoid the possibility of a future transaction being declined. Other issuers have simply discontinued the practice of charging over-limit fees. In practice, whether a customer opts into such fees or not, banks have discretion over authorizing transactions above the credit limit. Of course, any approved over-limit transactions result in an over-limit fee only for those customers who have opted into this fee. The Credit CARD Act of 2009 took effect on 22 February 2010. Following this act, issuers are now required to show on a customer's bills how long it would take to pay off the balance.

=== France ===
What is called a credit card in the United States—that is, a customer must pay a bill at the end of the month—does not exist in the French banking system. A debit card deducts from the customer's account as soon as the transaction is made, while a credit card automatically debits the customer's account at the end of the month, so it is impossible to fall into debt by forgetting to pay a credit card bill. Specialized credit companies can provide US-style credit cards, but these companies are separate from the regular banking system. In this case, the consumer determines the credit limit.

Credit scores and credit history do not exist in France; therefore, there is no need to build a credit history through credit cards. Personal information cannot be shared among banks, which means that no centralized system exists for tracking creditworthiness. The only centralized system in France is for people with three types of financial difficulty: credit not repaid, checks issued with insufficient funds, or bankruptcy filed. This system is handled by the Bank of France.

=== Vietnam ===
In Vietnam, there are more than 39 million active credit cards. Credit limits are set by the bank or card-issuing organization on the basis of factors such as the applicant's income, credit score, credit history, and personal financial profile. Credit limits can be adjusted upon user request and agreement with the card provider. The penalty for exceeding the credit limit is set by each bank, and it usually ranges from 1% to 5% of the over-the-limit amount per month. In addition, cardholders are charged interest on any amount spent over the limit.

=== European Union ===
The EU places caps on both interchange fees and fees outside the country of origin.

- Cap on interchange fee: The interchange fee is paid between banks for the acceptance of card-based transactions, and it is usually a percentage of the transaction amount. In the EU, the interchange fee is capped:
  - For debit cards, the maximum is 0.2% of the transaction amount. This cap also applies to universal cards, which can function as both debit and credit cards.
  - For credit cards, the maximum is 0.3% of the transaction amount.

By comparison, interchange fees average 1.78% in Canada and 1.73% in the United States.

These caps are designed to prevent excessive fees and ensure a level playing field for all financial institutions.

- Cap on fees outside the country of origin: According to EU regulations, payment and withdrawal fees outside the country of origin are unlawful. For example, this implies that a French customer withdrawing money in Italy cannot be required to pay more fees than for a withdrawal in France. The same rule applies to payments made with credit or debit cards. In general, this means that there are no additional fees for using a credit card abroad.

== Neutral consumer resources ==
=== Canada ===
The government of Canada maintains a database of the fees, features, interest rates, and reward programs of nearly 200 credit cards available in the country. This database is updated on a quarterly basis with information supplied by credit card issuers. Information in the database is published every quarter on the website of the Financial Consumer Agency of Canada (FCAC).

Information in the government's database is published in two formats. First, it is available in PDF comparison tables that break down the information according to credit card type; this allows the reader to compare, for example, the features of all student credit cards in the database. Second, the database feeds into an interactive tool on the FCAC website. This tool uses several interview-type questions to build a profile of a user's credit card usage habits and needs, thereby eliminating unsuitable choices based on this profile; as a result, the user is presented with a small number of credit cards and can perform detailed comparisons of features, reward programs, interest rates, etc.

== Credit cards in ATMs ==
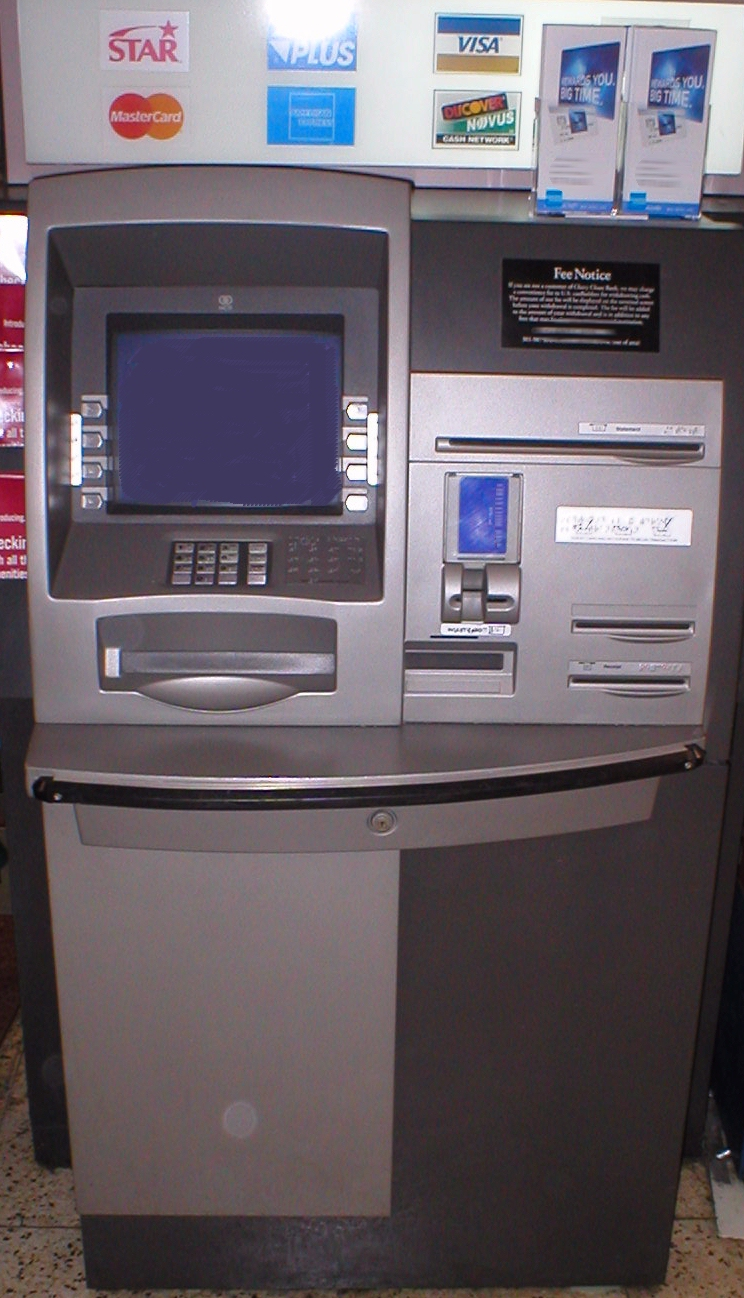
Acceptance mark at an ATM

Many credit cards can be used in an automated teller machine (ATM) to withdraw money against the card's credit limit, but many card issuers charge interest on cash advances before they do so on purchases. The interest on cash advances is commonly charged from the date that the withdrawal is made; unlike interest on purchases, the interest on cash advances is not waived even if the customer pays the statement balance in full. Many card issuers charge a commission for cash withdrawals, even if the ATM belongs to the same bank as the card issuer. Merchants do not offer cashback on credit card transactions, because the merchants would pay a percentage commission of the additional cash amount to their bank or merchant services provider, thereby making the transaction uneconomical. Discover is a notable exception to this practice. A customer with a Discover card may receive up to $120 cashback if the merchant allows it. This amount is simply added to the cardholder's transaction cost, and no extra fees are charged because the transaction is not considered a cash advance.

Many credit card companies in the US, when applying payments to a card, will do so at the end of a billing cycle, applying these payments to all transactions before cash advances. For this reason, many consumers have large cash balances, which have no grace period and incur interest at a rate that is usually higher than the purchase rate; such consumers carry those balances for years, even if they pay off their statement balance each month. This practice is not permitted in the UK, where the law states that any payments must be assigned first to the balance bearing the highest rate of interest.

=== Acceptance mark ===
An acceptance mark is a logo or design that indicates which card schemes an ATM or merchant accepts. Common uses include decals and signs at merchant locations or in merchant advertisements. The purpose of the mark is to provide a cardholder with information on where their card can be used. An acceptance mark differs from the card product name (e.g., American Express Centurion Card and Eurocard), because it shows the card scheme (group of cards) accepted. An acceptance mark corresponds to the card scheme mark shown on a card.

However, an acceptance mark does not absolutely guarantee that all cards belonging to a given card scheme will be accepted. On occasion, cards issued in a foreign country may not be accepted by a merchant or ATM because of contractual or legal restrictions.

== Credit cards as funding for entrepreneurs ==
Credit cards and prepaid cards are a risky way for entrepreneurs to acquire capital for their start-ups when more conventional financing is unavailable. For example, Len Bosack and Sandy Lerner used personal credit cards to start Cisco Systems. Larry Page and Sergey Brin started Google with credit card financing for the necessary computers and office equipment, specifically "a terabyte of hard disks". Similarly, filmmaker Robert Townsend financed part of the movie Hollywood Shuffle using credit cards. Director Kevin Smith funded Clerks in part by reaching the limit on several credit cards. Actor Richard Hatch also financed his production of Battlestar Galactica: The Second Coming partly through his credit cards. Famed hedge fund manager Bruce Kovner began his career in financial markets (and later, his firm Caxton Associates) by borrowing on his credit card. British entrepreneur James Caan (as seen on the television series Dragons' Den) financed his first business using several credit cards.

These stories are outliers, however, since more than 80% of all start-ups fail in their first year. This approach leaves any entrepreneur who tries this method to finance their start-up with high personal costs, because credit cards are in the legal name of a person, rather than that of a business.

== Cashback reward programs ==
Cashback reward programs are incentive programs established by credit card issuers to encourage use of a card. Spending on the card typically awards the card users with points or cash-points that allow the user to redeem points for rewards, such as the following: gift cards; statement credits or cash deposited in an account of the card user's choice; or frequent-flyer program credits. Spending that qualifies for these points can include or exclude balance transfers, payday loans, or cash advances. Points typically have no cash value until redeemed via the issuer.

Depending on the card type, rewards generally cost the issuer between 0.25% and 2.0% of the interest spread. Networks such as Visa and MasterCard have increased their fees to allow issuers to fund their rewards system. Some issuers discourage redemption by forcing the cardholder to call customer service to redeem rewards. On a servicing website, the feature for redeeming rewards is usually well hidden by the issuers. Many credit card issuers, particularly those in the United Kingdom, Canada, and the United States, run these programs to encourage card use. Reward programs create a two-sided market between merchants and consumers, resulting in increased adoption of credit cards.

Cardholders typically receive between 0.5% and 3% of their net expenditure (purchases minus refunds) as an annual rebate; this rebate is either credited to the credit card account or paid separately to the cardholder. Unlike unused gift cards—whose breakage in certain US states is remitted to the state's treasury—unredeemed credit card points are retained by the issuer.

In 2010, the Federal Reserve conducted a public policy study concluding that cashback reward programs result in a monetary transfer from poor to rich households. Eliminating cashback reward programs would reduce merchant fees, which would in turn reduce consumer prices, because the retail environment is so competitive.

=== Costs of rewards programs to merchants ===
When accepting payment by credit card, merchants typically pay a percentage of the transaction amount in commission to their bank or merchant services provider. The credit card issuer shares some of this commission with the cardholder as an incentive to use the credit card when performing a transaction. Rewards-based credit card products—such as cashback—are more beneficial to consumers who pay their credit card balance in full each month. Rewards-based products generally have higher annual percentage rates. If the balance is not paid in full each month, the additional interest will eclipse any rewards earned. Most consumers do not know that their rewards-based credit cards charge higher "interchange" fees to vendors who accept them.

== See also ==
- Card (disambiguation)
- Accountable fundraising
- ATM card
- Billing descriptor
- Cashback website
- Compulsive shopping
- Credit card hijacking
- Credit rating agency
- Credit reference agency
- Criticism of credit scoring systems in the United States
- Debit card
- Debt-lag
- Dynamic currency conversion (DCC)
- Electronic money
- Fair Credit Reporting Act
- Identity theft
- Installment credit
- Payment card
- Purchasing card
