= Credit limit =

Maximum amount of credit lent to a debtor

A credit limit is the maximum amount of credit that a financial institution or other lender extends to a debtor on a particular credit card or line of credit. Lenders generally set limits based on specific information about credit-seeking applicants, including income and employment status. Credit limits play an influential role on a consumers' credit scores and their eligibility to obtain future credit

This limit is determined by various factors, including an individual's ability to make interest payments, an organization's cashflow or ability to repay the credit card debt. These factors are often summarized into a credit score, which institutions use to determine credit eligibility. Credit limits could affect 20% to 30% of a clients credit score based on a credit utilization ratio - Percentage of revolving credit Debt to Revolving credit available. Credit utilization ratios exceeding 30% are where negative effects on credit scores become more pronounced. Credit limit calculation is done to ensure that total receivable exposure is consistent with the financial capabilities of the client and so a credit limit is set for each buyer. If the credit limit is lower than the theoretical credit limit, it is necessary to reduce the outstanding by negotiating better payment terms or by getting payment guarantees.

A line of credit that has reached or exceeded its limit is considered maxed out. When maxed out, the line of credit cannot be used for any further activity unless the consumer pays off at least some of the debt to enable it to fall below the limit, the creditor agrees to extend the limit, or the creditor allows one or more additional purchases with the charging of an over-the-limit fee.
