= OptOutPrescreen.com =

US website for opting out of credit card solicitations

OptOutPrescreen.com is a joint venture among Equifax, Experian, Innovis, and TransUnion, allowing customers to opt out of receiving credit card solicitations by mail.

Under the Fair Credit Reporting Act (FCRA), consumer reporting agencies are permitted to include customers' names on lists used by creditors or insurers to make offers of credit or insurance that are not initiated by the customer. The FCRA also provides customers the right to opt out, which prevents consumer reporting agencies from providing credit file information to others.

Beginning on August 1, 2005, the Fair and Accurate Credit Transactions Act of 2003 took effect, which amended the FCRA to require consumer reporting agencies to include in their credit offers a statement allowing customers to stop unsolicited offers either by phone and mail(1-888-5OPTOUT or 1-888-567-8688) or via https://www.optoutprescreen.com/

The opt out process allows users to choose from three options:

1. Opt-In: Your name will be eligible for inclusion on lists used for Firm Offers of credit or insurance.
2. Electronic Opt-Out for 5 years: Your name will not be eligible for inclusion on lists used for Firm Offers of credit or insurance for five years.
3. Permanent Opt-Out by Mail: Your name will no longer be eligible for inclusion on lists for Firm Offers of credit or insurance

In order to permanently Opt-Out of unsolicited offers, you must buy a stamp and print and mail a physical paper Permanent Opt-Out Election form. There is no option to permanently opt out electronically.

The OptOutPrescreen.com website is not accessible by users of ISPs located outside the United States and the U.S. Territories.
