= Credit CARD Act of 2009 =

US law on transparency with credit cards

Credit Card Accountability Responsibility and Disclosure Act of 2009
- Long title: An Act to amend the Truth in Lending Act to establish fair and transparent practices relating to the extension of credit under an open end consumer credit plan, and for other purposes.
- Nicknames: Credit CARD Act of 2009
- Enacted by: the 111th United States Congress
- Effective: February 22, 2010

Citations
- Public law: 111-24
- Statutes at Large: 123 Stat. 1734 through 123 Stat. 1766

Codification
- Acts amended: Truth in Lending Act; Fair Credit Reporting Act; Electronic Fund Transfer Act; Omnibus Appropriations Act, 2009
- Titles amended: 5, 11, 15, 20, and 31

Legislative history
- Introduced in the House as H.R. 627 by Carolyn Maloney (D–NY) on January 22, 2009; Committee consideration by House Committee on Financial Services, Senate Committee on Banking, Housing, and Urban Affairs; Passed the House on April 30, 2009 (357-70); Passed the Senate on May 19, 2009 (90-5) with amendment; House agreed to Senate amendment on May 20, 2009 (279-147); Signed into law by President Barack Obama on May 22, 2009

The Credit Card Accountability Responsibility and Disclosure (CARD) Act of 2009 is a federal statute passed by the United States Congress and signed by U.S. President Barack Obama on May 22, 2009. It is a comprehensive credit card reform legislation that aims "to establish fair and transparent practices relating to the extension of credit under an open end consumer credit plan, and for other purposes." The bill was passed with bipartisan support by both the House of Representatives and the Senate.

== Introduction and votes ==
The Credit Cardholders' Bill of Rights was introduced in the 110th Congress as H.R. 5244 in the House of Representatives by Representative Carolyn Maloney, a Democrat from New York and the chair of the House Financial Services Committee's Subcommittee on Financial Institutions and Consumer Credit. The bill had passed 312–112 but was never given a vote in the Senate.

In the 111th United States Congress, the bill was reintroduced as H.R. 627 and on April 30, 2009, the House passed it by a vote of 357–70. The Senate followed suit and passed an amended version on May 19 by a vote of 90–5. The House passed the amended bill the next day by a vote of 279–147 and it was signed into law by President Barack Obama on May 22, 2009.

The bill went into effect on February 22, 2010, nine months after it was enacted.

== Provisions ==
The Credit Cardholders' Bill of Rights includes several provisions aimed at limiting how credit card companies can charge consumers but does not include price controls, rate caps, or fee settings.

Key provisions include:

- Giving consumers enough time to pay their bills. Credit card companies have to give consumers at least 21 days to pay from the time the bill is mailed. Credit card companies cannot "trap" consumers by setting payment deadlines on the weekend or in the middle of the day, or changing their payment deadlines each month. Creditors may not charge late fees if debtor shows proof of payment by close of business on the due date. If the established due date falls upon a Saturday, Sunday, or legal banking holiday, the due date is pushed back to the next business day.
- No retroactive rate increases. Credit card companies must give consumers at least 45 days notice if their rates are about to go up, and can not change any terms of the contract within a year. Low introductory rates must last at least six months.
- Easier to pay down debt. Credit card companies must apply payment amounts "in excess of the minimum payment amount" to a consumer's highest interest rate balances first. Statements must show consumers how long it would take to pay off their existing balance if the consumer made only the minimum payment, and must show the payment amount and total interest cost to pay off the entire balance in 36 months.
- Eliminates "fee harvester cards." The Act contains a provision that limits the first year annual fee for a credit card to 25% of the credit limit. Credit card issuers are still able to charge certain additional fees, such as "setup fees" or "program fees." The Act also restricts the fees that can be charged for gift cards and other prepaid cards.
- Eliminates excessive marketing to young adults. Consumers under the age of 21 must prove that they have an independent income or get a co-signer before applying for a credit card. The Act also prevents credit card companies from mailing offers to consumers under 21 unless they "opt in," and prohibits companies from wooing students with T-shirts, free pizza and other free gifts at university-sponsored events.

=== Amendment on guns in national parks ===
Gun rights advocates in the Senate, led by Tom Coburn added an unrelated rider to the bill to prevent the Secretary of the Interior from enforcing any regulation that would prohibit an individual from possessing a firearm in any unit of the National Park System or the National Wildlife Refuge System. The Senate passed the amendment with a vote of 67–29.

This amendment overturns a Reagan-era policy prohibiting firearms from being carried in national parks. The George W. Bush administration had attempted to implement a similar policy through the rulemaking process just before leaving office, but the change was struck down by a federal judge. The provision has been heavily criticized by some environmentalists and gun control advocates, but it was heavily applauded by gun rights groups.

== Effects ==
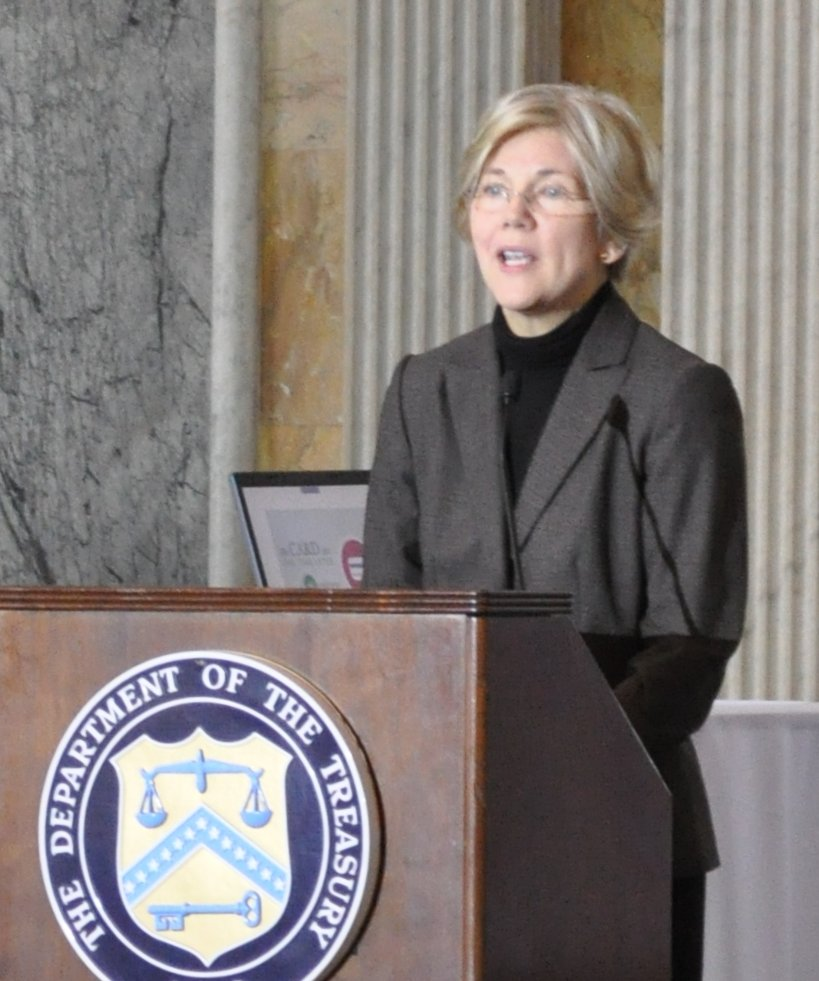
Elizabeth Warren delivers the keynote speech entitled "The CARD Act: One Year Later" at an evaluation symposium held February 22, 2011

The act was not expected to affect existing credit card contracts. However, the act that was passed applies to contracts made in the past by setting an effective date of February 22, 2010, which gave banks time to prepare and notify their customers. The Consumer Financial Protection Bureau in its October 2013 report on the CARD Act found that between the first quarter of 2009 and December 2012, credit card interest rates increased on average from 16.2% to 18.5%, while the “total cost of credit,” that is, the total of all fees and interest paid by all consumers as a percentage of the average cycle-ending balance, decreased by two hundred basis points (2.00%). The CFPB made no judgment on the extent to which the CARD Act contributed to these increases and decreases. However, interest rates on other types of consumer credit increased. The CFPB in its study also found that consumers paid less in late payment and over-the-limit fees since passage of the CARD Act. In contrast, studies by CardHub.com and the Center for Responsible Lending argued that interest rate trends were the result of economic pressures typical of a recession and not the law. According to these studies, historical economic data shows that the interest rate increase and decline in available credit seen during the Great Recession should have been worse considering the widespread unemployment, credit card delinquency and credit card charge-offs.

Section 502(a) of the CARD Act requires a review of the consumer credit card market to be undertaken every two years. In February 2013 letter to the Consumer Financial Protection Bureau as part of the review, the American Bankers Association wrote that "the CARD Act has provided clear and significant benefits to consumers" but "there have also been significant tradeoffs, specifically, higher costs and less availability for credit card credit." The American Bankers Association, in its letter responding to the CFPB's request for information on the impact of the act, argued that following the implementation of the CARD Act and associated regulations, "average credit card interest rates have increased and credit card credit is less available, especially to subprime borrowers" and "credit card debt has decreased at a higher rate than other consumer debt and has decreased as a percent of disposable income as non‐revolving debt as a percent of disposable income has increased."

A study published in the Quarterly Journal of Economics in 2014 (by Neale Mahoney of the University of Chicago, Sumit Agarwal of the National University of Singapore, Souphala Chomsisengphet of the Office of the Comptroller of the Currency and Johannes Stroebel of the New York University Stern School of Business) found that the law was saving American consumers $11.9 billion a year, and particularly decreased costs for borrowers with poor credit. The researchers further found "no evidence of an increase in interest charges or a reduction to access to credit."

In a speech on the one-year anniversary of the CARD Act, then-CFPB Special Adviser Elizabeth Warren said that "much of the [credit card] industry has gone further than the law requires in curbing re-pricing and overlimit fees." However, she said there was still much work to be done, that the Consumer Financial Protection Bureau's "next challenges will be about further clarifying price and risks and making it easier for consumers to make direct product comparisons."

In 2012, many stay-at-home spouses complained that because they have no individual income, the act prevented them from acquiring credit cards without their husbands' permission. On April 29, 2013, the CFPB amended regulations to allow credit card issuers to consider third-party income for applicants who are 21 or older, if the applicant has a reasonable expectation of access to it.

In December 2015, the CFPB concluded that credit card overlimit fees were “essentially extinct” as a result of the CARD Act.

A 2025 study found that the shift towards pooled pricing in the 2009 CARD Act had the following effects:

Prices fell for high‐risk and price‐inelastic consumers, but prices rose elsewhere in the market and newly exceeded willingness to pay for over 30% of the safest subprime borrowers. On net, average traded prices fell and consumer surplus rose at all credit scores. Higher consumer surplus was partly driven by a fall in lender profits, and partly by the Act's insurance value to borrowers who could retain favorable pricing after adverse changes to their default risk.

== Sponsors and cosponsors ==
The bill was cosponsored by House Financial Services Committee chair Barney Frank and Representatives Maxine Waters, Luis Gutiérrez, Stephen Lynch, Keith Ellison, Steve Cohen, Chaka Fattah, Maurice Hinchey, Jim Langevin, Jerrold Nadler, Carol Shea-Porter, Hilda Solis, Peter Welch, Albert Wynn, Peter DeFazio, Charles Gonzalez, Gene Taylor, David Obey, Mazie Hirono, Debbie Wasserman Schultz, Nancy Boyda, John Dingell, Corrine Brown, Bennie Thompson, Alcee Hastings, Yvette Clarke, Jesse Jackson Jr., Danny Davis, Kirsten Gillibrand, Eddie Bernice Johnson, Diane Watson, Michael Arcuri, Eliot Engel, John Tierney, Chris Van Hollen, George Miller, Jim Moran, Anthony Weiner, Neil Abercrombie, and Jan Schakowsky.
