= Trailing interest =

Form of credit card interest

Trailing interest (also known as residual or two-cycle interest) refers to the interest that accrues on a credit card balance after the statement is issued, but before the balance is repaid.

The monthly statement shows how much interest is owing at the time it is produced. The balance then continues to accrue interest until it is repaid. This additional interest is typically added to the following month's statement.

It has been criticised as an unfair practice, as it allow companies to collect interest on balances that the customer believes they have already paid off.
