= Revolving credit =

Type of credit that does not have a fixed number of payments

Revolving credit is a type of credit that does not have a fixed number of payments, in contrast to installment credit. Credit cards are an example of revolving credit used by consumers. Corporate revolving credit facilities are typically used to provide liquidity for a company's day-to-day operations. They were first introduced by the Strawbridge and Clothier Department Store.

It is an arrangement which allows for the loan amount to be withdrawn, repaid, and redrawn again in any manner and any number of times, until the arrangement expires. Credit card loans and overdrafts are revolving loans, also called evergreen loan.

== Typical characteristics ==
- The borrower may use or withdraw funds up to a pre-approved credit limit.
- The amount of available credit decreases and increases as funds are borrowed and then repaid.
- The credit may be used repeatedly.
- The borrower makes payments based only on the amount used or withdrawn, plus interest.
- The borrower may repay over time (subject to any minimum payment requirement), or in full at any time.
- In some cases, the borrower is required to pay a fee to the lender for any money that is undrawn; this is especially true of corporate bank revolving-credit loans.

A revolving loan provides a borrower with a maximum aggregate amount of capital, available over a specified period of time. Unlike a term loan, the revolving loan allows the borrower to draw down, repay and re-draw loans on the available funds during the term of the note. Each loan is borrowed for a set period of time, usually one, three or six months, after which time it is technically repayable.

Repayment of a revolving loan is achieved either by scheduled reductions in the total amount of the loan over time, or by all outstanding loans being repaid on the date of termination. A revolving loan made to refinance another revolving loan which matures on the same date as the drawing of the second revolving loan is known as a "rollover loan", if made in the same currency and drawn by the same borrower as the first revolving loan. The conditions to be satisfied for drawing a rollover loan are typically less onerous than those for other loans.

A revolving loan is a particularly flexible financing tool as it may be drawn by a borrower by way of straightforward loans, but it is also possible to incorporate different types of financial accommodation within it – for example, it is possible to incorporate a letter of credit, a swingline (that is, a short-term borrowing that is funded on one day's notice), or an overdraft within the terms of a revolving credit loan. This is often achieved by creating a sublimit within the overall loan, allowing a certain amount of the lenders' commitment to be drawn in the form of these different facilities.

Revolving credit accounts play a significant role in consumer credit scoring. Because revolving accounts have variable balances relative to a credit limit, they directly affect a borrower's credit utilization ratio — the proportion of available revolving credit currently in use. Under widely used scoring models such as the FICO score, credit utilization accounts for approximately 30 percent of a consumer's score, making revolving credit accounts particularly influential in building or damaging creditworthiness.

In project finance, revolving credit facilities—commonly known as "revolvers"—are employed to manage short-term liquidity and ensure that critical debt service obligations are met even when operational cash flows are variable. For example, a renewable energy project might secure a $1,000,000 revolving credit facility. When the project draws $400,000 for operational expenses, it is charged an upfront fee—typically around 1.5% of the total facility (amounting to $15,000)—and interest is assessed on the drawn amount. This interest is calculated as the sum of a fixed margin and a floating base rate; for instance, with a 2.0% margin and a 3.5% base rate, the effective rate becomes 5.5%, resulting in annual interest costs of approximately $22,000 on the $400,000 drawn. Moreover, the undrawn portion of the facility ($600,000 in this example) incurs a commitment fee, often calculated as a percentage of the margin—for example, 40% of the 2.0% margin, which equates to an effective fee rate of 0.8% (or $4,800 per year). These fees collectively ensure that funds are available when needed while compensating the lender for maintaining the credit line. In certain projects, this structure is integrated with a Debt Service Reserve Facility (DSRF), so that if the project’s Cash Flow Available for Debt Service (CFADS) falls short of the scheduled debt service—say, if only $80,000 is available when $100,000 is required—the DSRF can cover the shortfall and help maintain debt repayments. Revolving Credit Facility in Renewable Energy Finance | Renewables Valuation Institute

== Examples ==
- Credit card
- Line of credit
- Home equity line of credit

== See also ==
- Installment credit
- Debt-snowball method
