= Schumer box =

Summary of the costs of a credit card in the U.S.

The Schumer box is a summary of the costs of a credit card in the United States. It is named after Chuck Schumer, then New York congressman (United States senator since 1999) who was responsible for the legislation requiring that terms of credit cards be clearly outlined in any promotional material. The law was enacted in 1988 and took effect in 1989 in the United States. Similar legislation was enacted in the United Kingdom and took effect in March 2004. Credit card companies are required to list long-term rates in at least 18-point type and other key disclosures in 12-point type.

The Schumer box includes:

- Annual fee if applicable
- Annual percentage rate for purchases (APR)
- Other APRs (balance transfer, cash advances, default APRs)
- Grace period
- Finance calculation method
- Other transaction fees (balance transfers, late payments, exceeding credit limit fee, cash advances)

All credit card companies use the same format, making comparison shopping for credit cards easy.

The Schumer box is also known as the summary box, transparency box, clarity box, consumer box and honesty box.

== See also ==
- CFPB
- Chuck Schumer
- Truth in lending Act
