= Line of credit =

Arranged ability to borrow money

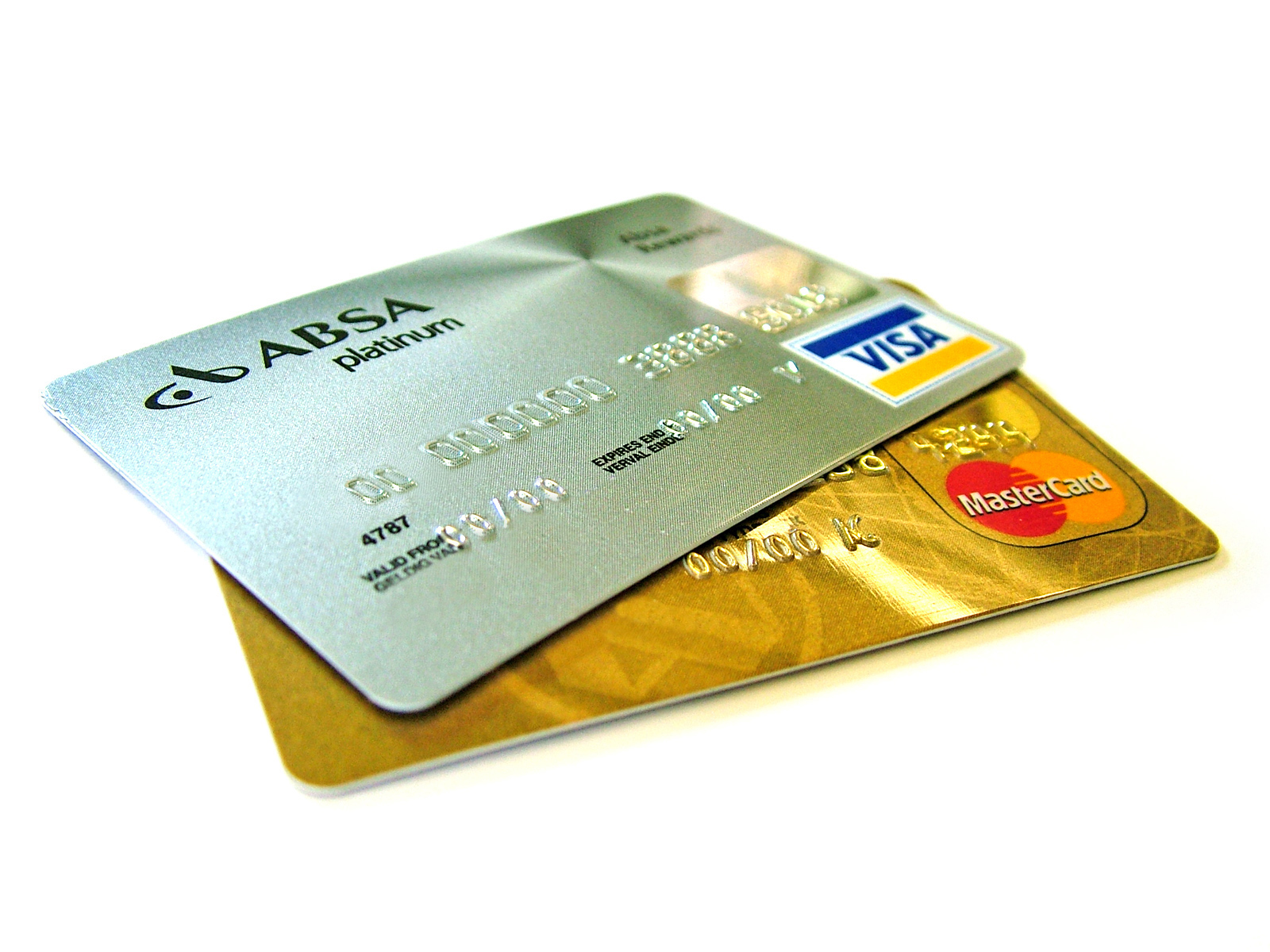
A credit card is a common form of credit. With a credit card, the credit card company, often a bank, grants a line of credit to the card holder. The card holder can make purchases from merchants, and borrow the money for these purchases from the credit card company.

A line of credit is a credit facility extended by a bank or other financial institution to a government, business, or individual that allows the borrower to draw funds as needed, up to a specified credit limit. The borrower incurs debt when funds are drawn from the facility.

A line of credit takes several forms, such as an overdraft limit, demand loan, special purpose, export packing credit, term loan, discounting, purchase of commercial bills, traditional revolving credit card account, etc. It is effectively a source of funds that can readily be tapped at the discretion of the borrower's. Interest is paid only on money actually withdrawn. Lines of credit can be secured by collateral, or may be unsecured.

Lines of credit are often extended by banks, financial institutions and other licensed consumer lenders to creditworthy customers (though certain special-purpose lines of credit may not have creditworthiness requirements) to address fluctuating cash flow needs of the customer. The maximum amount of funds a customer is allowed to draw from a line of credit is typically called the credit limit or overdraft limit. The term credit limit is commonly used for credit cards whereas the term overdraft limit is more commonly used for bank accounts.

== Unsecured vs secured LOCs ==
Most personal lines of credit are unsecured. This means the borrower does not promise the lender any collateral for taking an unsecured line of credit. One exception is home equity lines of credit (HELOC), which are secured by the equity in homes.

Secured lines of credit offer the lender the right to seize the asset in case of non-payment.

Because their risk is lower, secured lines of credit typically come with a higher maximum credit limit and significantly lower interest rate.

On the other hand, unsecured lines of credit have higher interest rates than secured lines of credit. A borrower must have a high credit score and good repayment history to meet the eligibility criteria for getting an unsecured line of credit. Since the unsecured credit line is not backed with collateral, if the borrower defaults on payments, the lenders cannot recover their losses. Hence, the lenders can minimize their risk by charging high-interest rates and restricting the credit line limit.

Besides the HELOC, another relatively common form of secured LOC is the Securities Backed Line of Credit (SBLOC). This is also commonly referred to as a Pledged Asset Line. In this version, the borrower pledges securities (typically stocks, bonds, etc.) to the lender as collateral. The lender will typically lend less than the full value of the securities pledged, applying various "haircuts," depending on the lenders' assessment of how risky the pledged security is. For example, a lender might lend up to 80% of the value of a bond, but only 50% of the value of a stock. It's important to note that these LOCs are designated as non-purpose, meaning the proceeds cannot be used to purchase additional securities, unlike a margin loan. Because of this, the loan to value ratios are typically higher than a margin loan, although, since the financial institution can set their own LTVs, this does not necessarily have to be the case. Depending on the LTV required, a borrower can sometimes use a margin loan to achieve the same objective as an SBLOC, since they can use the proceeds of their margin loan to purchase goods and services other than securities. Borrowers, should be wary of these financial instruments, however, since they could be subject to a margin call, similar to what can happen with a margin loan, if the value of their pledged securities falls too low. Lenders also typically structure these LOCs as demand loans, meaning they have the right to demand full repayment of the loan at any time.

== Revolving vs close-end LOCs ==
A revolving line of credit allows a borrower to repeatedly draw money, up to their credit limit. It has a monthly payment and works similarly to a credit card.

A closed-end line of credit, on the other hand, has a fixed term. The term is divided into a draw period, where the borrower can draw money from the LOC as needed up to their credit limit, and a repayment period, where they can no longer draw money and are required to make monthly payments.

== Cash credit ==
A cash credit is a short-term cash loan to a customer. A bank provides this type of funding only after the required security is given to secure the loan. In cash credit, the bank advances a cash loan up to a specified limit to the customer against a bond or other security. Once a security for repayment has been given, the business that receives the loan can continuously draw from the bank up to a certain specified amount.

=== Pakistan ===
In Pakistan, banks offer cash credit accounts to businesses to finance their working capital requirements. These are usually to buy materials or current assets, as opposed to machinery or buildings (which would be called fixed assets). The cash credit account is similar to current accounts as it is a running account (i.e., payable on demand) with cheque book facility. But unlike ordinary current accounts, which are supposed to be overdrawn only occasionally, the cash credit account is supposed to be overdrawn almost continuously. The extent of overdrawing is limited to the cash credit limit that the bank sanctioned. This sanction is based on an assessment of the maximum working capital requirements of the organization, minus the margin. The organization finances the margin amount from its own funds.

== Business lines of credit ==
A business line of credit is quite similar to personal lines of credit. The financial institution grants access to a specific amount of financing. A business line of credit can be unsecured or secured (typically, by inventory, receivables or other collateral). Lines of credit are often referred to as revolving and can be tapped into repeatedly. For instance, if there is access to a $60,000 line of credit and $30,000 is taken out, access to the remaining $30,000, if necessary, remains. If all $30,000 is paid back, there is access to the entire $60,000 without having to reapply, one of the biggest benefits of a line of credit.

== Costs and interest ==
The bank or financial institution will normally charge a fee for setting up a line of credit. The fee would typically cover the cost of processing the application, performing security checks, legal fees, arranging collateral, registrations, besides other things.

Normally, no interest is payable under the line of credit until the customer actually draws on a part or all of the credit facility. There may also be a fee for keeping the credit facility open, which may be a monthly, quarterly or annual fee. This may be called an “unused line fee”, which often is an annualized percentage fee on the money not withdrawn. Credit card companies typically charge an “annual account fee”; they also typically apply complex interest charging rules, such as no interest being payable on purchases if the account is paid in full by the monthly due date, interest is payable on cash withdrawals from the day of such withdrawals, minimum monthly repayment amounts, etc.
