= Blended mobility =

Blended mobility is an educational concept that combines physical academic mobility, virtual mobility and blended learning. It aims to promote employability of higher education students. Since 2009 it has evolved from virtual mobility, keeping the international value of academic mobility, but at the same time giving a concrete answer to possible family related, financial, psychological and social barriers of a physical mobility.

The virtual mobility part of blended mobility is mostly supported through the use of information and communication technologies (e.g. Skype, Adobe Connect, Slack, Google Hangout, Trello) to stay connected with the teachers or students who may be situated at many distant locations. The physical mobility part is typically of short-term duration, ranging from 2 to 14 days. There may exist multiple periods of short-term mobility. Short periods of physical mobility enable participants to focus for a couple of days only on the actual project, which is difficult in daily life in a local environment.

Early applications of a blended mobility format can be found back in 2009. Through this project an environment was created which encourages the development of students’ soft skills, such as teamwork and communication, in an international setting by means of an innovative instruction paradigm to improve such skills without expensive and extensive curricular changes.

The blended mobility paradigm may be executed through various formats.

Blended mobility is also seen and recognised by the European Commission as a preparation for the long-term physical mobility or as complementing regular study programmes.

In the Digital Education Action Plan of the European Commission (January 2018) it is stated that blended mobility will be further promoted with new opportunities in Erasmus+ to support both online and face-to-face learning and student exchange in different countries.

== Initiatives ==
- Being mobile project
- Europe Now: web platform for European mobile students and alumni of a wide range of European exchange programmes
- EUVIP: Enterprise-University Virtual Placements
- Mobi-Blog: The European Weblog platform for mobile students
- Move-IT: Seminars Promoting Virtual Support For Mobile Students
- PROVIP: Promoting Virtual Mobility in Placements
- VICTORIOUS: Virtual Curricula Through Reliable Interoperating University Systems
- VM-BASE: Virtual Mobility Before and After Student Exchanges
- MUTW: Multinational Undergraduate Team Work
- AdriArt: Advancing Digital and Regional Interactions in Art Teaching
- B-AIM: Blended Academic International Mobility
