= Svigals =

Svigals is a surname. Notable people with the surname include:

- Alicia Svigals, American violinist and composer
- Barry Svigals, American architect and sculptor
- Jerome Svigals, American engineer
