= ISO/IEC 4909 =

2006 international standard

ISO/IEC 4909 is a 2006 international standard produced by the International Organization for Standardization (ISO) and the International Electrotechnical Commission (IEC) for Identification cards — Financial transaction cards — Magnetic stripe data content for track 3. It was reviewed in 2018. The original ISO 4909 standard appeared in 1987. It is one of a number of international bank card standards. The standard is used for credit cards.

The standard has been adopted in many countries, including (for example) Denmark, Germany, India, Netherlands, New Zealand, Norway, United Kingdom, etc.
