= Hôtel de Ville, Vélizy-Villacoublay =

Town hall in Vélizy-Villacoublay, France

Hôtel de Ville
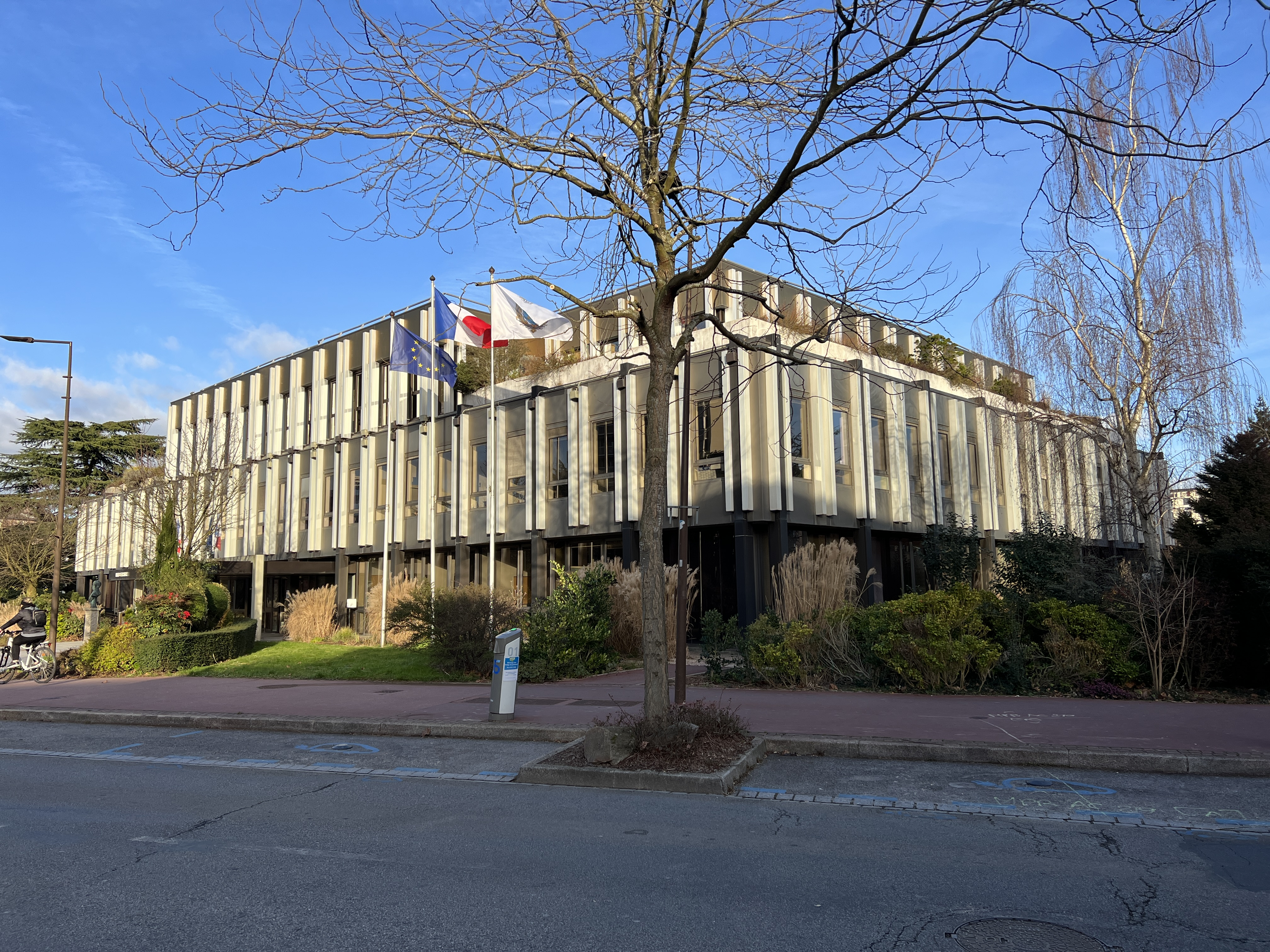
- The main frontage of the Hôtel de Ville in February 2023
- Interactive map of the Hôtel de Ville area

General information
- Type: City hall
- Architectural style: Modern style
- Location: Vélizy-Villacoublay, France
- Coordinates: 48.7828°N 2.1905°E
- Completed: 1974

Design and construction
- Architect: Alain Gillot

The Hôtel de Ville (French pronunciation: [otɛl də vil], City Hall) is a municipal building in Vélizy-Villacoublay, Yvelines, in the northwestern suburbs of Paris, standing on Avenue de Capitaine Tarron.

== History ==
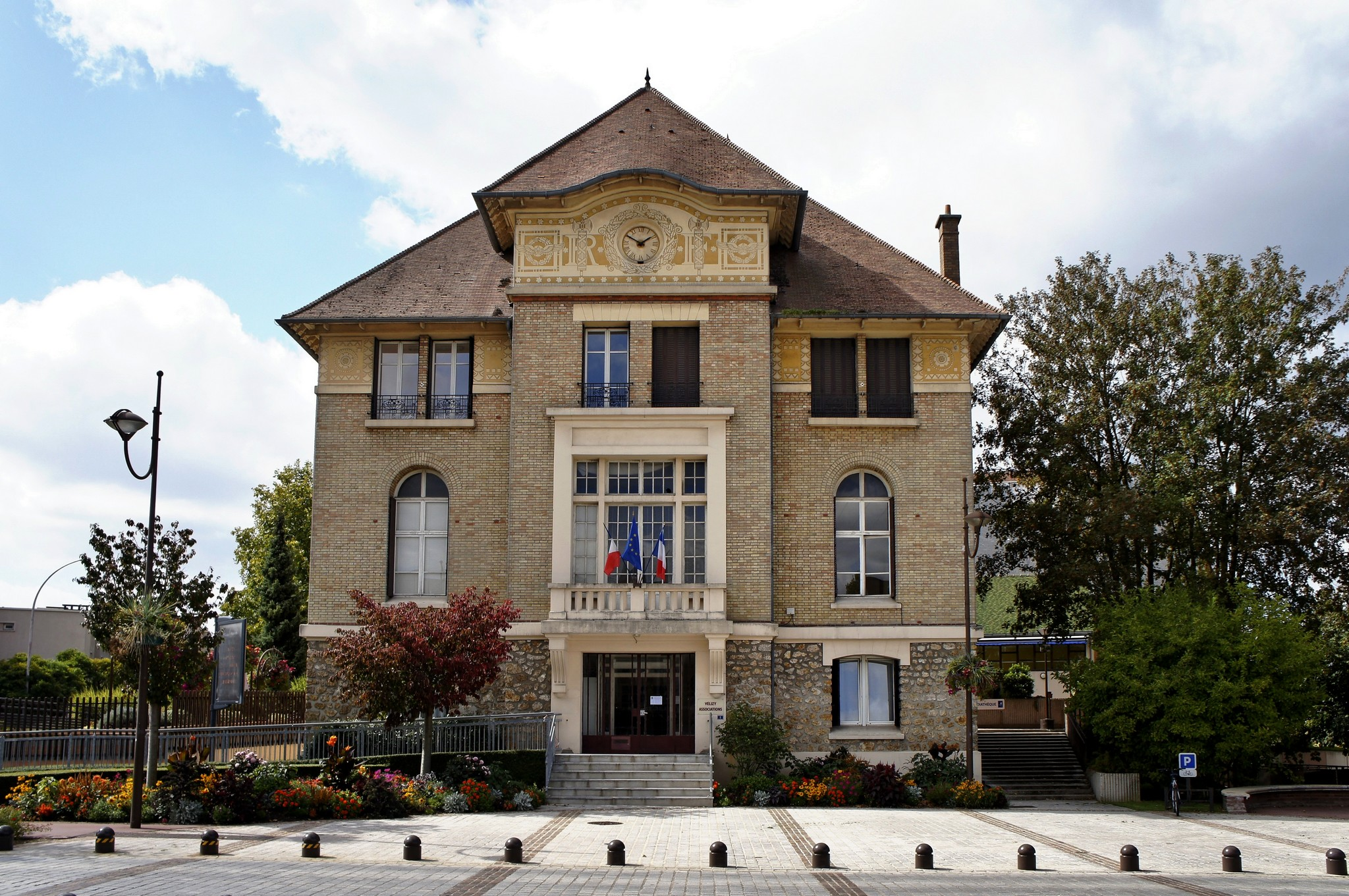
The second town hall

=== The first town hall ===
Following the French Revolution, meetings of the new town council were initially held in the home of the mayor at the time. This arrangement continued until the early 1880s, when the council led by the mayor, Ovide Gossart, decided to commission a combined town hall and school. The site they selected was on Rue de Villacoublay. The new building was designed in the neoclassical style, built in rubble masonry and was officially opened on 6 November 1887. The design involved a main frontage of just one bay facing onto the street. There was a doorway on the ground floor and a casement window in the gable above. When the building was no longer required for municipal use, it was converted into a post office, before later being demolished.

=== The second town hall ===
In the late 1920s, following significant population growth, the council led by the mayor Gabriel Gauzère, decided to commission a more substantial town hall. The site they selected was on the west side of what is now Avenue de Capitaine Tarron in the heart of the town. The new building was designed in the neoclassical style, built in brown brick and was officially opened by the mayor, Emile Prat, on 25 September 1932.

The design involved a symmetrical main frontage of three bays facing onto the street. The central bay, which was projected forward, was formed by a four-stage tower with a pyramid-shaped roof: the first stage contained a wide square-headed doorway with a stone surround, the second stage contained a French door with a stone surround and a balustraded balcony, the third stage contained a pair of casement windows surmounted by a stone entablature and the fourth stage contained a clock, surrounded by ornate decorations. The outer bays were fenestrated by segmental-headed windows on the ground floor, by round-headed windows on the first floor and by pairs of casement windows on the second floor. A sculpture, designed by Maurice Calka and known as the "L'Icare Volant" (The Flying Icarus) was installed behind the building in 1985. After the building ceased to be required for municipal use, it was converted for use as a police station which, in May 2018, was renamed in memory of the former mayor, Raymond Loisel.

=== The third town hall ===
In the early 1970s, following a significant increase in population, the council led by the mayor, Robert Wagner, decided to commission a modern town hall. The site they selected, which was on the opposite side of Avenue de Capitaine Tarron to the old town hall, had been occupied by the former Madame René Coty school. The new building was designed by Alain Gillot in the modern style, built in concrete and glass and was officially opened by the Prime Minister of France, Jacques Chirac, on 18 September 1974.

The design involved a long main frontage of 26 bays facing onto the street. The entrance was in the centre of the building on the ground floor. The first floor, which was projected forward over the pavement, was fenestrated by dark-framed casement windows separated by pairs of vertical concrete bars. Internally, the principal room was the salle du conseil (council chamber).

In 2000, the building was expanded to a design by Maria Laera in a similar style. The expansion was achieved by the creation of an extra floor. The central section of 12 bays was increased in height in line with the main frontage, and the next five bays on either side were also increased in height but the new sections were recessed from the main frontage.
