= Campus card =

Student identification document

A campus credential, more commonly known as a campus card, campus ID card, or student ID card, is an identification document certifying the status of an educational institution's students, faculty, staff or other constituents as members of the institutional community, eligible for access to services and resources. Campus credentials are typically valid for the duration of either a student's enrollment, or an employee's service.

== Functions ==
The functions of the campus credential, in addition to data storage for the student's identification, vary by university. Some examples of campus credential functions are:

- Building access (classroom, residence halls, recreational facilities, libraries, dining facilities, lockers, etc.)
- Equipment access (computers, copy machines, printers, etc.)
- Transportation access (campus and/or public transportation, parking permits, ride sharing, bike rentals, etc.)
- Cashless payment for dining, vending, laundry, and at campus retail locations
- Mobile banking
- Library card
- Time and attendance control
- Exam registration
- Mobile phone and NFC services

Campus credentials with multiple functions can help simplify internal administrative processes.

== Technology ==
Electronic card access has been available on campuses since as early as 1968. Early versions, such as the “VALI-DINE” system at the Rochester Institute of Technology, relied on cards with mechanically punched holes to allow access to their dining halls. In the years following, the use of campus credentials and technology has matured. In 1972, California State Polytechnic University installed the first known card-based system utilizing magnetic stripe technology. By 1985, the Harco multi-application, campus-wide system utilizing bar code, Prox contact-based chips, and magnetic stripe technology, was implemented by Duke University. Technological advances continued to pick up speed, with both cashless payment systems introduced by Debitek Inc. and copy machine management introduced by DANYL Corporation in 1986. By the 1990s, universities began linking their campus cards to banks, with Florida State University being the first in 1990. DataCard introduced its first color digital imaging card production system in 1993. In 2001, contactless chip technology cards were introduced, and CBORD released the first IP-addressable card reader for campus credential access systems. (Huber, 2007). Technology continued to ramp up later, with cloud-based Campus Credential systems growing in popularity in 2005. By 2015, the use of smart devices instead of physical cards soared, and by 2020, wearable credentials, such as wristbands and fobs, gained popularity, along with mobile apps and digital wallets to manage credential functionality (Huber, n.d.).

Several universities throughout North America and Oceania use digital wallets such as Apple Wallet for iOS & watchOS, Google Wallet for Android, and Samsung Wallet for Android & Wear OS to store campus cards as mobile credentials. Some universities have replaced physical cards entirely with digital IDs. Samsung Wallet (on Android) and Apple Wallet (on iOS) allow the use of IDs when the phone's screen is off, or the battery is depleted. Samsung allows up to 15 taps within 24 hours, and Apple rates its reserve feature as being available for 5 hours after initial depletion.

== See also ==
- Academic mobility network
- Barcode
- Card printer
- Erasmus Programme
- Identification document
- International Student Identity Card
- Magnetic Stripe
- MIFARE
- Multi-factor authentication
- Near-field communication
- Personal identification number
- Proximity card
- RFID
- Smartcard
