= Magnetic developer =

Fluid that shows information encoded on magnetic media

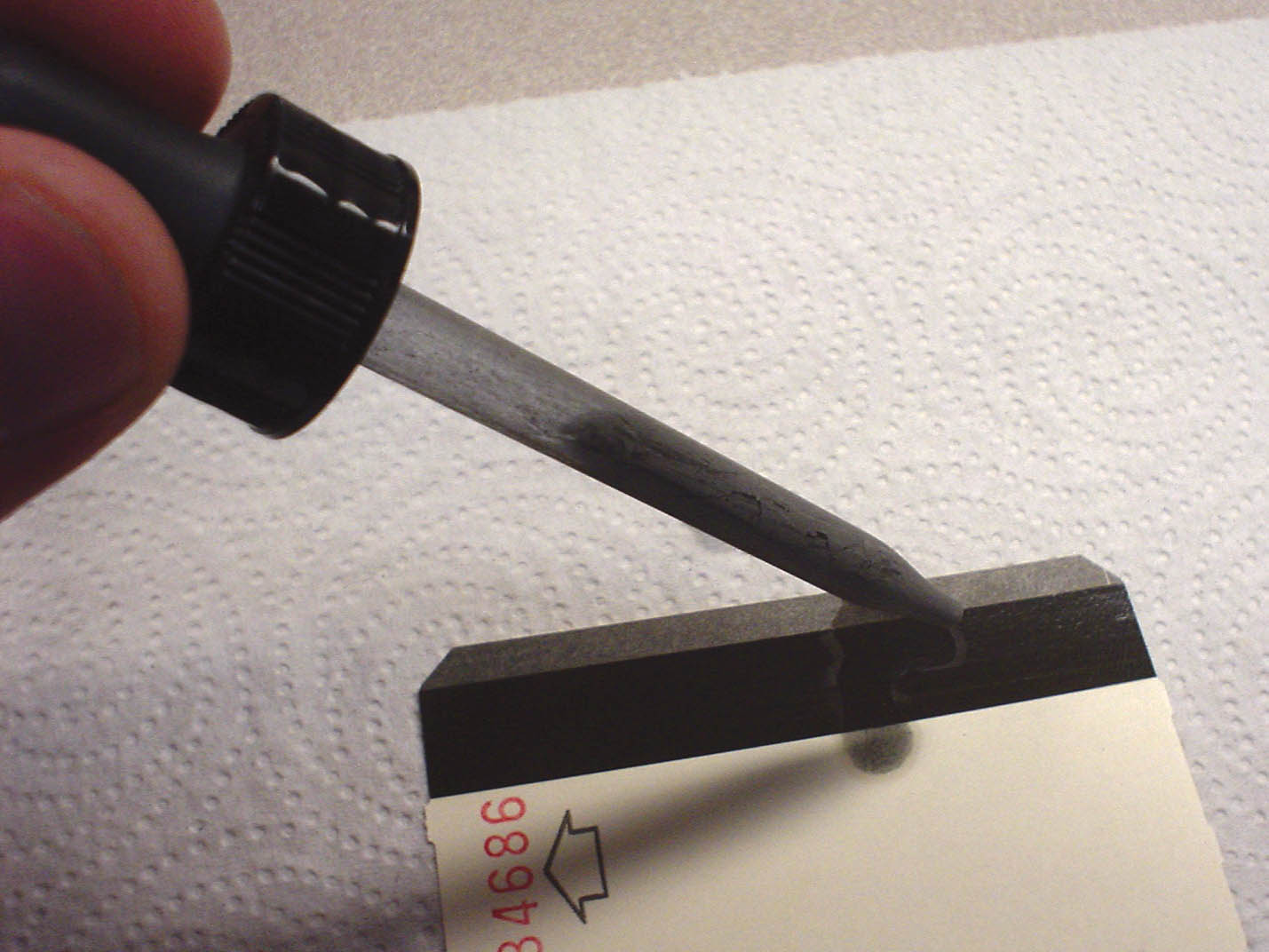
Applying Magnetic Developer to a magnetic stripe

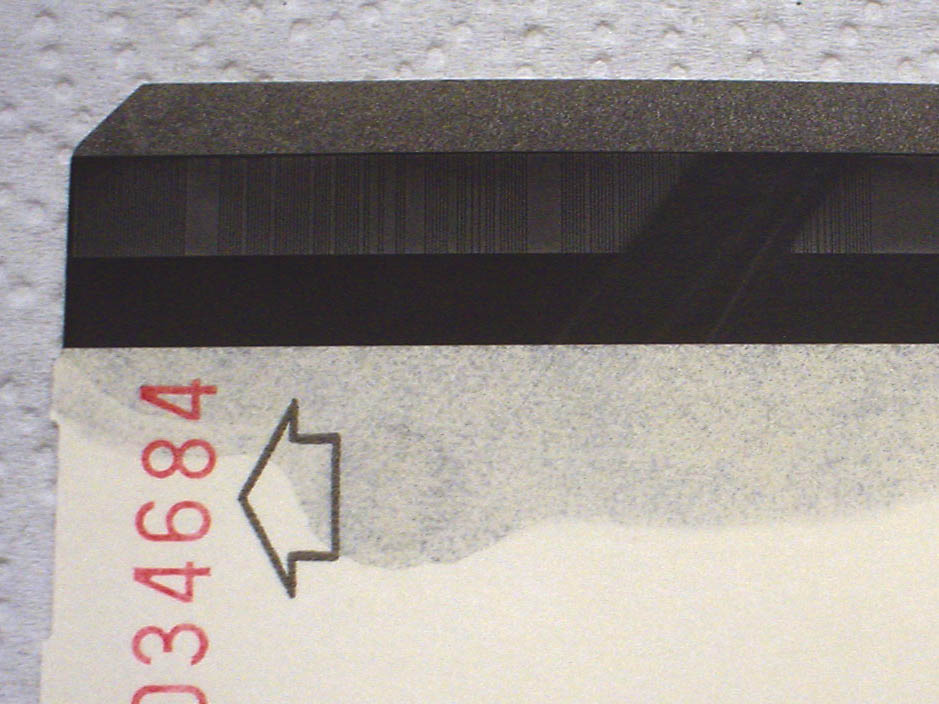
An example of damaged magnetic encoding. A magnet was run across this stripe. The encoding has been made visible by applying a Magnetic Developer solution

Magnetic developer is a fluid which makes the magnetic information written on magnetic media such as magnetic tape, diskettes or the magnetic stripe of a credit card or ATM card visible to the naked eye. Commercial brands of magnetic developer included Edivue and Magnasee.

Magnetic developer can be found in liquid or aerosol form. When applied to a magnetic recording medium, suspended metal particles will be attracted to the magnetically charged regions of the medium as the liquid evaporates. The particles are micron-sized, and can be made of carbonyl iron, suspended in naptha or fluorocarbons as a medium.

Magnetic developer was an important tool for video editing in the early days of quadruplex videotape, when editing was achieved by physically splicing the tape. However, cutting and rejoining the tape without paying attention to the timing of the video signal would result in a substantial picture disturbance at each edit point. Magnetic developer was painted onto the tape at the edit point to make the timing signals visible, allowing the editor to splice the tape while maintaining the correct timing relationship between the two parts being joined. Video tape splicing was made obsolete for editing purposes by the introduction of electronic editing techniques, but it remained useful for repairing damaged tapes.

Magnetic developer can be used to troubleshoot problems with magnetic recordings and the equipment that encodes and reads them. By making the encoding visible, one can identify the bit density of the recording, see how encoding head alignment affects the position of the data tracks, and observe any possible magnetic damage that has occurred to the recording.
