= MicroDry =

A picture of the MicroDry 1300, one of the models in the MicroDry Family

MicroDry is a computer printing system developed by the ALPS corporation of Japan. It is a wax/resin-transfer system using individual colored thermal ribbon cartridges, and can print in process color using cyan, magenta, yellow, and black cartridges, as well as spot-color cartridges as white, metallic silver, and metallic gold, on a wide variety of paper and transparency stock. Certain MicroDry printers can also operate in dye sublimation mode, using special cartridges and paper. ALPS licensed the technology to Citizen (Printiva series) and to Okidata (Oki DP series). Alps also produced the actual printer hardware and ink ribbon cartridges for those companies.

A typical MicroDry printer includes a moving carriage containing the print head, which is capable of picking up cartridges from a rack on the front cover of the machine, printing with them, and returning them to the rack, without human intervention. Printing is normally done one color at a time, printing the entire cyan portion of the page, then retracting the page to print the entire magenta portion, then yellow, then black (or yellow, magenta, cyan, and a protective overcoat, in dye sublimation mode). When multiple spot colors are used in addition to CMYK, the printer can be manually directed to retract the page at the end of the printing cycle, instead of ejecting it, thus assuring that the spot colors remain in registration.

Because ALPS had little name recognition among United States consumers, because it could not interest other major printer manufacturers in its system, and because it is considerably slower than most ink-jet systems, the MicroDry system never achieved wide acceptance despite its ability to produce clear, waterproof, fade-resistant hardcopy. It has found a niche market in certain types of large format printers used in the signage industry, as well as an extremely loyal following among those who understand its capabilities. ALPS does continued to produce mechanisms for use in plotters, as well as supplies, and had pledged to continue doing so for as long as there is a significant demand.

However, as of March 2007, ALPS ceased support of the MicroDry technology outside Japan. MicroDry printers and consumables were still manufactured and supported for the Japanese domestic market, however, and there still are suppliers of the printers and consumables sourcing stock from Japan for sale worldwide. As of May 2010, Alps discontinued sales of their latest MicroDry printer, the MD-5500. Alps will discontinue supplying the MicroDry consumables in May 2015.

The feature yet unsurpassed on MicroDry technology is its ability to print unconventional inks; white, metallic colours and clear (matte or gloss) finish. This feature is especially sought after on modelmaking community for printing decals (which often involve white colour), and also for T-shirt customizing. Neither inkjet nor laser printers can print any other colours than CMYK, as they assume the media is always white. As such, they are not suitable for purposes other than generic home and office printing. MicroDry printers can be used on printing non-white or transparent media, which inkjets or laser printers cannot handle sufficiently well, and they can also handle a variety of media, such as plastic, cardboard or even metals. The second-hand MicroDry printers are much sought after and can be expensive (prices ranging in early 2006 from USD 300 to 700, depending on condition).

== See also ==
- Thermal transfer printer
