= Forrest Parry =

American inventor

Forrest Corry Parry (July 4, 1921 – December 31, 2005) was an American IBM engineer who invented the magnetic stripe card used for credit cards and identification badges.

== Early life ==
Parry was born in Cedar City, Utah to Edward H. Parry and Marguerite C. Parry. Forrest attended the Branch Agricultural College (BAC) now Southern Utah University, in Cedar City before entering the U.S. Naval Academy at Annapolis, Md, in 1942. He graduated from the Naval Academy in June 1945.

== Career ==
When the Korean War began in 1950, Parry served on the USS Walke as First Lieutenant and Damage Control Officer. After the Walke was hit by a torpedo or floating mine which killed 26 sailors and wounded 40, Parry was awarded a Bronze Star with Valor.

After leaving the Navy in 1952, Parry went to work at Lawrence Livermore National Laboratory and married Dorothea Tillia. They raised five children. Parry left Livermore in 1954 to work for Dow Chemical and then at Unette Corporation, a small plastic packaging firm.

In May 1957, Parry began his 30-year career with IBM, mostly in Rochester, Minnesota. While at IBM, he developed devices and systems for high-speed printers, optical character readers, Universal Product Code (UPC) checkout systems, and an Advanced Optical Character Reader (AOCR) which reads addresses from mailed letters and reprints it as bar codes for easy resorting at smaller post offices that have simpler and cheaper sorting machines.

In 1960, while at IBM, Parry invented the magnetic stripe card for use by the U.S. Government. He had the idea of gluing short pieces of magnetic tape to each plastic card, but the glue warped the tape, making it unusable. When he returned home, Parry's wife Dorothea was using a flat iron to iron clothes. When he explained his inability to get the tape to "stick" to the plastic in a way that would work, she suggested that he use the iron to melt the stripe onto the card. He tried it and it worked. The heat of the iron was just high enough to bond the tape to the card. Magnetic stripes are used on credit cards, debit cards, gift cards, stored-value cards, hotel keycards, and security identification badges, though they are being phased out in favor of other means of digital identification, such as QR codes and NFC chips and apps.

== Publications ==
- F. C. Parry, IBM Technical Disclosure Bulletin, "Identification Card", Vol. 3, No. 6, November 6, 1960, page 8

== See also ==
- Credit card
- Magnetic stripe card
- Access badge
