= Dip reader =

A DIP reader (Document Insertion Processor) is an electronic device for reading an electronically encoded card that is inserted and then removed from the device.

A typical dip reader is used for reading credit cards where the data are either encoded on a magnetic stripe or an internal computer chip. The magnetic stripe on a card is typically read as the card is extracted. If the card is a smart card, then the data transfer typically takes place when the card is fully inserted. In this case, the card is held while data transfer is taking place.
