= Card printer =

Printer for personalized plastic cards and photo identity cards

A card printer is an electronic desktop printer used to print and personalize plastic cards. Unlike label printers, which have a continuous supply feed, card printers have a single-card feeder. Card dimensions are usually 85.60 × 53.98 mm, standardized under ISO/IEC 7810 as ID-1. This format, commonly known as the bank card format, is used in many applications relying on magnetic stripe cards or smart cards, including credit cards, debit cards, telephone cards, driver's licenses and health insurance cards, access badges, school and campus cards, season passes, loyalty programs, etc.

Card printers are controlled by corresponding printer drivers or by means of a specific programming language. Generally card printers are designed with laminating, striping, and punching functions, and use desktop or web-based software. The hardware features of a card printer differentiate a card printer from the more traditional printers, as ID cards are usually made of PVC plastic and require laminating and punching. Different card printers can accept different card thickness and dimensions.

== Print process ==
The principle is the same for practically all card printers: the plastic card is passed through a thermal print head at the same time as a color ribbon. The color from the ribbon is transferred onto the card through the heat given out from the print head. The standard performance for card printing is 300 dpi (300 dots per inch, equivalent to 11.8 dots per mm). There are different printing processes, which vary in their detail:

Thermal transfer
Mainly used to personalize pre-printed plastic cards in monochrome. The color is "transferred" from the (monochrome) color ribbon onto the card.
Dye sublimation
This process uses four panels of color according to the CMYK color ribbon. The card to be printed passes under the print head several times each time with the corresponding ribbon panel. Each color in turn is diffused (sublimated) directly onto the card. Thus it is possible to produce a high depth of color (up to 16 million shades) on the card. Afterwards a transparent overlay (O) also known as a topcoat (T) is placed over the card to protect it from mechanical wear and tear and to render the printed image UV resistant.
Reverse-image technology
The standard for high-security card applications that use contact and contactless smart chip cards. The technology prints images onto the underside of a special film that fuses to the surface of a card through heat and pressure. Since this process transfers dyes and resins directly onto a smooth, flexible film, the print head never comes in contact with the card surface itself. As such, card surface interruptions such as smart chips, ridges caused by internal RFID antennae and debris do not affect print quality. Even printing over the edge is possible.
Thermal rewrite print process
In contrast to the majority of other card printers, in the thermal rewrite process the card is not personalized through the use of a color ribbon, but by activating a thermal sensitive foil within the card itself. These cards can be repeatedly personalized, erased and rewritten. The most frequent use of these are in chip-based student identity cards, whose validity changes every semester.

== Common printing problems ==
Many printing problems are caused by physical defects in the card material itself, such as deformation or warping of the card that is fed into the machine in the first place. Printing irregularities can also result from chip or antenna embedding that alters the thickness of the plastic and interferes with the printer's effectiveness. Other issues are often caused by operator errors, such as users attempting to feed non-compatible cards into the card printer, while other printing defects may result from environmental abnormalities such as dirt or contaminants on the card or in the printer. Reverse transfer printers are less vulnerable to common printing problems than direct-to-card printers, since with these printers the card does not come into direct contact with the print head.

== Variations in card printers ==
=== Card printer types ===
Broadly speaking, there are three main types of card printers, differing mainly by the method used to print onto the card. They are:

Near-to-edge
This term designates the cheapest type of printing by card printers. These printers print up to 5 mm from the edge of the card stock.
Direct-to-card, also known as edge-to-edge printing
The print head comes in direct contact with the card. This printing type is the most popular nowadays, mostly due to cost factor. The majority of identification card printers today are of this type.
Reverse transfer, also known as high-definition printing or over-the-edge printing
The print head prints to a transfer film backwards (hence the reverse) and then the printed film is rolled onto the card with intense heat (hence the transfer). The term "over the edge" is due to the fact that, when the printer prints onto the film, it has a bleed and, when rolled onto the card, the bleed extends over the edge of the card, leaving no border.

=== Storage of digital information ===
Certain types of cards, called digital cards, can store digital information encoded onto a storage medium that is embedded into the card. The stored information can then be read automatically by a card reader and transferred to a computer for processing. This is especially useful for ID cards and access badges. ID-card printers may be equipped with a card data writer, enabling them to record information into a card's memory and print matching information onto the surface of the card, in a single pass. Different recording techniques are used, depending on the type of card:

Magnetic stripe card
A magnetic stripe card is a type of card onto which a short length of magnetic tape, the magnetic stripe or mag-stripe, has been permanently bonded. Information is stored by swiping the magnetic stripe past a magnetic recording head, installed in the card printer.
Contact smart card
A smart card uses an embedded integrated-circuit (IC) chip to store (and sometimes process) information. On a contact smart card, transferring information to the IC chip requires a physical connection between the chip's contacts and those of the card reader/writer, installed in the card printer.
Contactless smart card
A contactless smart card also uses an embedded integrated-circuit (IC) chip to store and process data, but communicates with the card reader/writer using a type of Radio-frequency identification (RFID) technology, such as Near-field communication (NFC) technology.

=== Other options ===
Duplex printing
A duplex card printer can print both sides of a card without manual intervention. In such printers, one side of the card is printed first; the card is then flipped in the duplex carriage and the other side is printed.
Lamination
A laminating card printer covers each card with a protective layer of clear plastic film after printing. Laminating a card greatly increases the durability of its printed appearance and may also provide some protection against tampering.

=== Software ===
Card printer software, used to produce images that will be printed on individual cards, can be desktop-based (installed on a personal computer) or web-based (online).

The use of desktop-based software usually requires owning a card printer. This is often the case for a large organization with high employee turnover, or those who need the ability to print cards at short notice (for example, a construction site with restricted access). Desktop-based solutions have the ability to retrieve individual data (such as the name and photograph of a person) from a database (or spreadsheet) and merge it into a base layout, common to many cards, to produce individualised images for each card that needs to be printed.

Web-based applications provide a more affordable solution to those with moderate card-printing needs, enabling them to design cards that will be printed by a commercial third-party.

== See also ==
- Typewriter ribbon
- Dye-sublimation printer
- Digital card
- Smart card
