= Dye-sublimation printing =

Digital printing technology with wide color range

Dye-sublimation printing (or dye-sub printing) is a term that covers several distinct digital computer printing techniques that involve using heat to transfer dye onto a substrate. It is often described as a dry printing technique.

The sublimation name was first applied because the dye was thought to make the transition between the solid and gas states without going through a liquid stage. This understanding of the process was later shown to be incorrect, as there is some liquefication of the dye. Since then, the process has become properly known as dye diffusion, though this technically correct term has not supplanted the original name.

Historically, "dye sublimation" referred to page printers that use a thermal printhead to transfer dye from a ribbon directly onto the print media via sublimation. While it originally was used in creating prepress proofs, today this technology survives in ID card printers and dedicated photo printers, often under the name dye diffusion thermal transfer (D2T2).

The term was later also applied to the indirect sublimation transfer printing process, which uses a standard inkjet printer to deposit sublimation-capable ink onto a transfer sheet. The printed transfer sheet is then pressed against the substrate with heat, transferring the dye to the substrate, such as plastic or fabric, via sublimation. Thus, this process is indirect, since the final substrate does not pass through the printer, and the sublimation step occurs separately.

The term direct dye sublimation is sometimes applied to a variant of digital textile printing using dye-sublimation inks printed directly onto fabric, which must then be heated to set the dyes, without the use of a transfer sheet.

== Dye-sublimation page printing ==
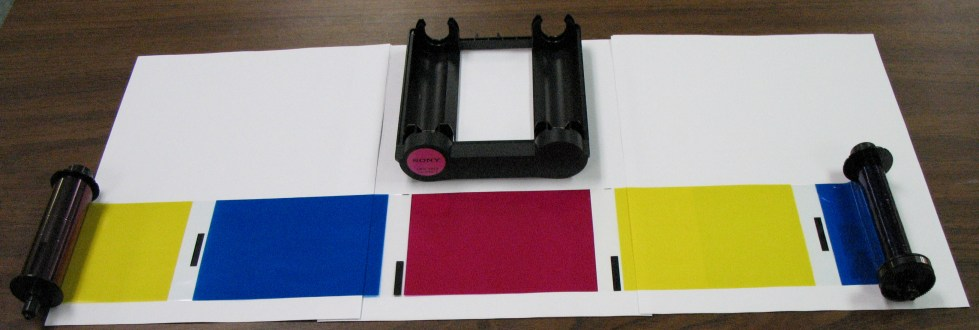
A disassembled dye sublimation cartridge

=== Process ===
Using a mechanism which is a variant of the thermal-transfer printer, the most common direct process lays down one color at a time, the dye being stored on a polyester ribbon that has each color on a separate panel. Each colored panel is the size of the medium that is being printed on; for example, a 4-by-6-inch (10 cm × 15 cm) dye-sub printer would have four 4-by-6-inch panels.

During the printing cycle, the printer rollers will move the medium and one of the colored panels together under a thermal printing head, which is usually the same width as the shorter dimension of the print medium. Tiny heating elements on the head change temperature rapidly, laying different amounts of dye depending on the amount of heat applied. Some of the dye diffuses into the printing medium.

After the printer finishes printing the medium in one color, it advances the ribbon to the next color panel and partially ejects the medium from the printer to prepare for the next cycle. The entire process is repeated four or five times in total: the first three lay the colors onto the medium to form a complete image; there may or may not then be a (wax ink) black thermal transfer process; the last pass lays the laminate over top. This layer protects the dyes from UV light and moisture.

For ID card printing, sharp text and bar codes are necessary, and they are printed by means of an additional wax-based black panel on the (YMCKO) ribbon. This extra panel works by thermal-transfer printing instead of dye diffusion: a whole layer, instead of just some of the dye in the layer, transfers from the ribbon to the substrate at the pixels defined by the thermal head.

=== Applications ===
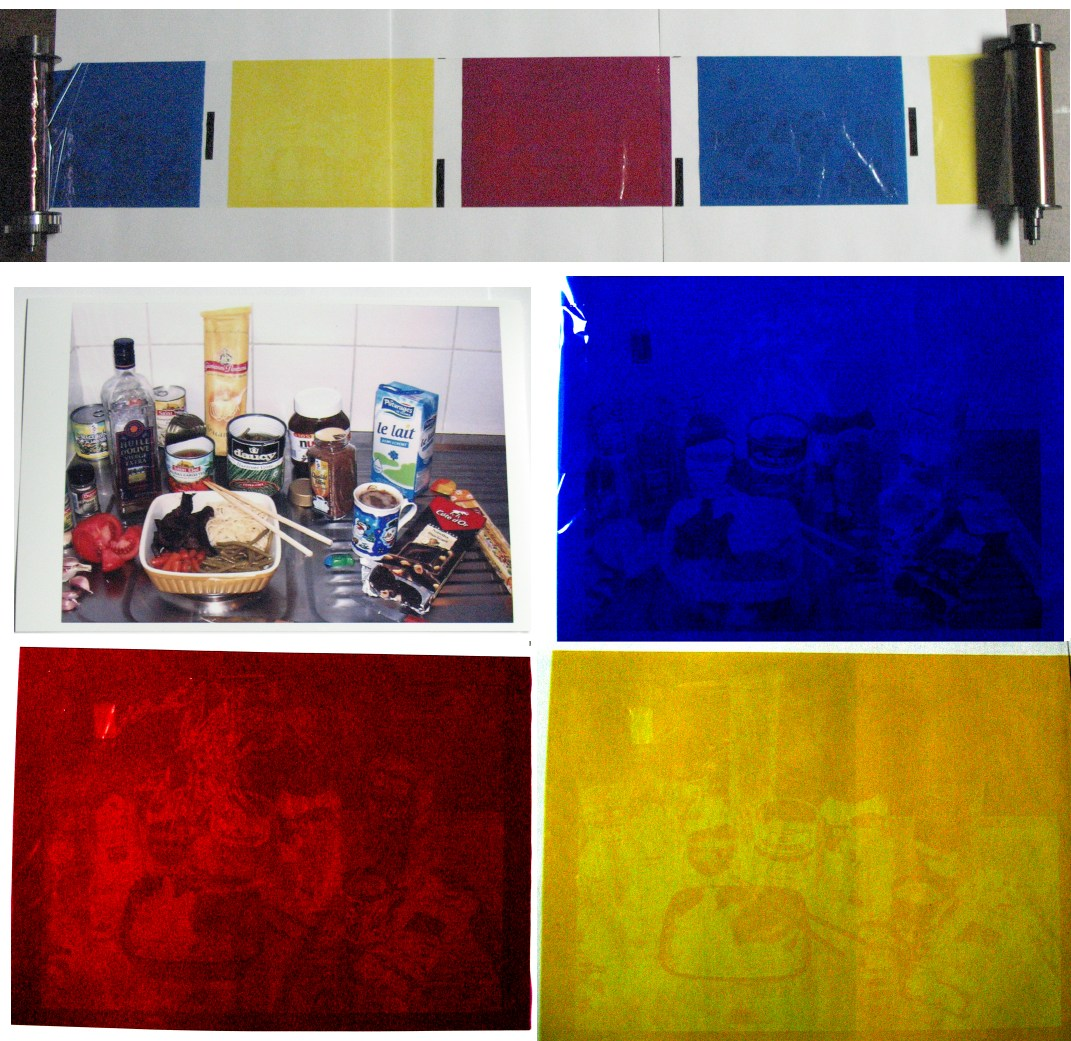
Used dye panels retain a viewable image of the printed document, and an example of wasted dye that cannot be reused.

Previously, the use of dye-sub printing was limited to industrial or high-end commercial printing. Dye-sub photo printing has been used in medical imaging, graphic arts proofing, security, and broadcast-related applications. Today, it remains popular in event photography and photo booths or kiosks that require high-speed, on-demand printing.

Alps Electric produced the first quality dye-sub printers for home consumers in the $500–$1,000 price range, bringing dye-sublimation technology within the reach of a wider audience. (These models were, however, not page printers, since they used a narrow printhead that swept across the page, like most inkjet printers.) Now there are many dye-sublimation printers on the market starting from as low as $100, especially postcard-sized mobile photo printers.

The ability to produce instant photo prints inexpensively from a small printer has led to dye sublimation solutions supplanting traditional instant photos in many applications, such as ID photography with a card printer.

Several corporations market desktop-size units as stand-alone printers and for print kiosk and photo booth applications. Some of these units are based on generic printers. Some manufacturers offer software development kits with their printers, suggesting that these companies hope to attract system integrators as a potential market.

Desktop-size standalone dye-sub photo printers are also used by photographers in event photography. The technology allows photographers to produce and sell lab-quality prints immediately during the event they are attending, with a minimal amount of hardware.

=== Print speed ===
As dye-sublimation page printers utilize heat to transfer the dye onto the print media, the printing speed is limited by the speed at which the elements on the thermal head can change temperature. Heating the elements is easy, as a strong electric current can raise the temperature of an element very quickly. However, cooling the elements down, when changing from a darker to a lighter color, is harder and usually involves having a fan/heatsink assembly attached to the print head. The use of multiple heads can also speed up this process since one head can cool down while another is printing. Although print times vary among different dye-sublimation printers, a typical consumer dye-sub printer can print a 4x6 in (10x15cm) photo in 45–90 seconds. More heavy-duty printers can print much faster; for example, a Sinfonia Colorstream S2 dye-sublimation printer can print a 4x6 in (10x15cm) photo in as little as 6.8 seconds, and a Mitsubishi CP-D707DW is known to have a faster print of under 6 seconds for similar size. In all cases, the finished print is completely dry once it emerges from the printer.

=== Comparison with inkjet printing ===
Traditionally, the advantage of dye-sublimation printing has been the fact that it is a continuous-tone technology, where each dot can be any color. In contrast, inkjet printers can vary the location and size of ink droplets, a process called dithering, but each drop of ink is limited to the colors of the inks installed. Consequently, a dye-sublimation printer produces true continuous tones appearing much like a chemical photograph. An inkjet print is composed of droplets of ink layered and scattered to simulate continuous tones, but under magnification, the individual droplets can be seen. In the early days of inkjet printing, the large droplets and low resolution made inkjet prints significantly inferior to dye-sublimation, but many of today's inkjets produce extremely high-quality prints using microscopic droplets and supplementary ink colors, producing superior color fidelity and sharpness to dye-sublimation.

Dye sublimation offers some advantages over inkjet printing. For one, the prints are dry and ready to handle as soon as they exit the printer. Since the thermal head does not have to sweep back and forth over the print media, there are fewer moving parts that can break down. The whole printing cycle is extremely clean as there are no liquid inks to clean up. These factors make dye-sublimation generally a more reliable technology than inkjet printing.

Dye-sublimation printers have some drawbacks compared to inkjet printers. Each of the colored panels of the ribbons, and the thermal head itself, must match the size of the media that is being printed on. Furthermore, only especially coated paper or specific plastics can accept the sublimated ink. This means that dye-sublimation printers cannot match the flexibility of inkjet printers in printing on a wide range of media.

The dyes diffuse a small amount before being absorbed by the media. Consequently, prints are not razor-sharp. For photographs, this produces very natural prints, but for other uses (such as graphic design) this slight blurriness is a disadvantage.

The amount of wasted dye per page is also very high; most of the dye in the four panels may be wasted for a typical print. Once a panel has been used, even to just print a single dot, the remaining dye on that panel cannot be reused for another print without leaving a blank spot where the dye was used previously. Due to the single-roll design of most printers, four panels of colored dye must be used for every print, whether or not a panel is needed for the print. Printing in monochrome saves nothing, and the three unused color panels for that page cannot be recycled for a different single-color print. Inkjet printers also suffer from 'dye wastage' as the ink cartridges are prone to drying up with low usage (without 'heavy use', the cartridge nozzles can become clogged with dried ink). Dye-sublimation media packs, which include both ribbon and paper, are rated for an exact number of prints which yields a fixed cost per print. This is in contrast to inkjet printers where inks are purchased by volume.

For environments that print confidential or secret documents, a dye-sublimation printer is a potential security risk that must be handled carefully. Due to the mechanism of printing, a perfect color-separated negative image of the printed page remains on the spent ribbon panels, and the "waste roll" of dye panels can be unrolled to see everything that has been printed with the printer. For such environments, the waste roll should be shredded or incinerated onsite rather than simply being discarded in the trash. Also, for home users, the waste roll from a photo printer can be similarly recovered from the garbage and used to see everything that has been printed. Since the supply roll is plastic, the lifespan of a used roll can be years or decades long, permitting image recovery long after disposal.

Also, dye-sublimation papers and ribbons are sensitive to skin oils, which interfere with the dye's ability to sublimate from the ribbon to the paper. They must also be free of dust particles, which can lead to small colored blobs appearing on the prints. Most dye-sublimation printers have filters and/or cleaning rollers to reduce the likelihood of this happening, and a speck of dust can only affect one print as it becomes attached to the print during the printing process. Finally, dye-sublimation printers fall short when producing neutral and toned black-and-white prints with higher density levels and virtually no metamerism or bronzing.

== Sublimation transfer printing ==
Sublimation transfer printing is a digital printing technology using full-color artwork that works with polyester and polymer-coated substrates. Originally used for printing polyester fabrics, the process is now commonly also used for decorating apparel, signs, and banners, as well as novelty items such as cell phone covers, plaques, coffee mugs, mouse mats, and other items with sublimation-friendly surfaces.

The images are first printed onto coated heat-resistant transfer paper as a mirror-image of the final design, which is then transferred from the transfer sheet onto the substrate using a heat press.

Early large-format printers used for printing transfer paper were modified electrostatic plotters using toner, but now are generally large-format inkjet printers using special inks. For small-format printing, inkjet has also become the dominant technology, though special dye-sublimation transfer laser printers are also available.

In order to transfer the image from the paper to the substrate, it requires a heat press machine process that is a combination of time, temperature, and pressure. Different settings are used depending on the substrate. This application will transfer the sublimation dyes at the molecular level into the substrate. The most common dyes used for sublimation activate at 350 degrees Fahrenheit / 175 degrees Celsius. However, a range of 380 to 420 degrees Fahrenheit / 195 to 215 degrees Celsius is normally recommended for optimal color.

The result of the sublimation transfer process is a nearly permanent, high-resolution, full-color print. Because the dyes are infused into the substrate at the molecular level, rather than applied at a topical level (such as with screen printing and direct to garment printing), the prints will not crack, fade or peel from the substrate under normal conditions. The fabric is permanently dyed so it can be washed without damaging the quality of the image. Advantages of dye-sublimation over other methods of textile printing: images are permanent and do not peel or fade, the dye does not build up on the fabric. Colors can be extraordinarily brilliant due to the bonding of the dye to the transparent fibers of the synthetic fabric, truly continuous tones can be achieved that are equivalent to photographs, without the use of special techniques such as half-screen printing, and the image can be printed all over the entire item, with no difficulty in printing all the way to the edges.

=== Piezo inkjet transfer printing ===
There are two types of dye sublimation inks for piezo inkjet transfer printers available in the market. The most popular one is aqueous dye sublimation ink for use in both desktop and large format printers. The other is solvent dye sublimation ink that can be used in XAAR, Spectra, and some Konica printhead-wide format printers.

Due to the fast development of digital textile printing, dye sublimation inks are becoming more and more popular in digital inkjet printing on fabrics.

Print speeds for large-format piezo inkjet printers using aqueous dye sublimation ink continue to increase. Speeds range from 18 square meters per hour in a smaller 44 in wide printer to over 3,000 square meters per hour in a high-speed industrial textile printer.

== Direct dye-sublimation fabric printing ==
In this type of digital textile printing, an inkjet printer is used to print dye-sublimation inks directly onto the fabric. The fabric is then heated in an oven or on a calender to diffuse and set the dyes.

== See also ==
- Barcode printer
- Card printer
- Daisy wheel printing
- Dot matrix printing
- Label printer
- Label printer applicator
- Line matrix printer
- Line printer
- List of art techniques
- Thermal transfer printing
- ID card printer
