= Optical turnstile =

Physical security device

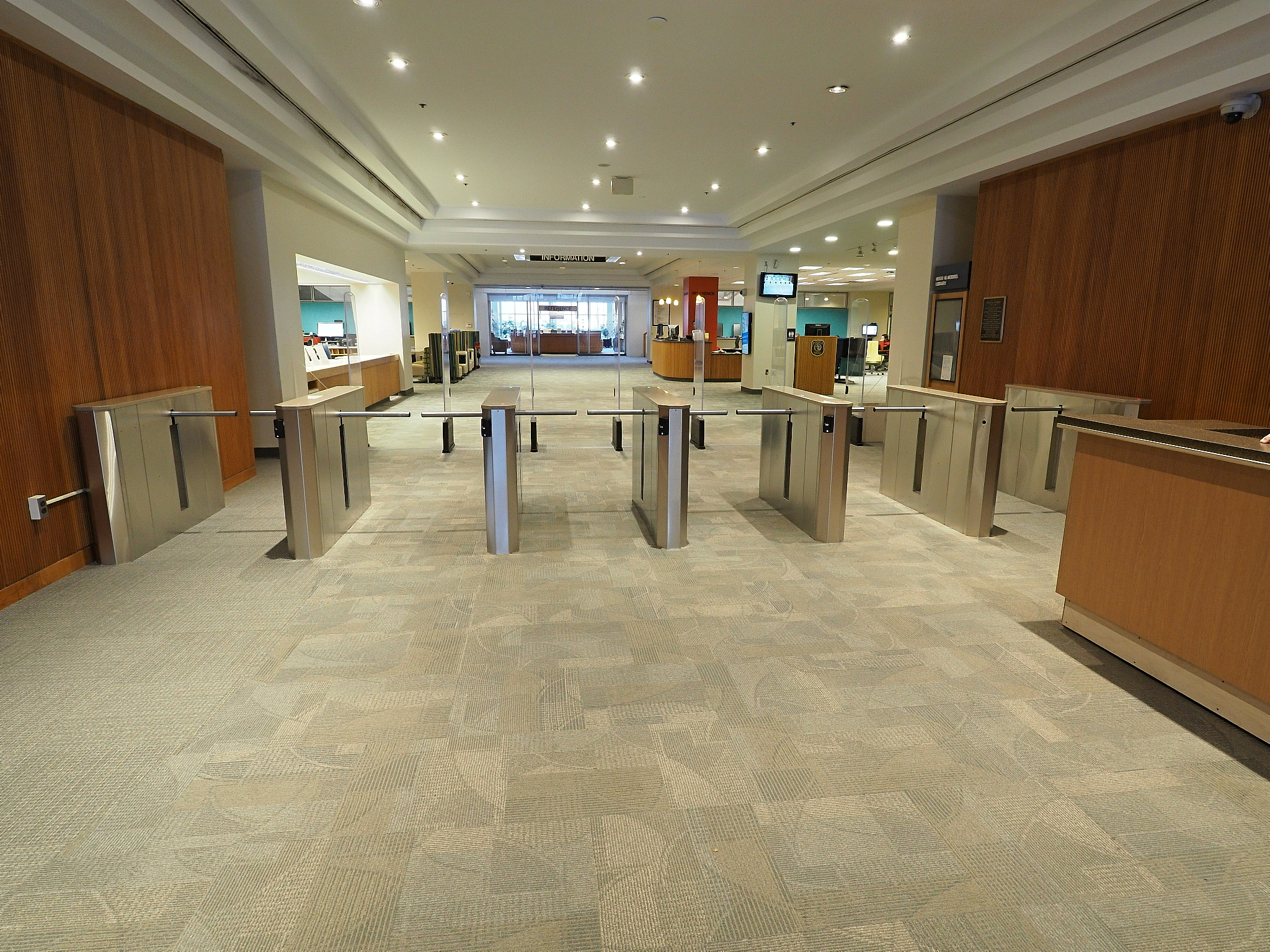
Drop Arm style optical turnstiles

An optical turnstile (also called a speed gate) is a type of turnstile designed to restrict or control access to a building or secure area. Optical turnstiles differ from mechanical turnstiles in that they rely on infrared sensing and are typically barrier-free, instead using audible and visual alerting systems, and sometimes retracting glass panels, to alert others and halt attempted entry by unauthorized individuals.

The Americans with Disabilities Act (ADA) drove optical turnstile development, as many turnstile variants (such as revolving turnstiles) offer limited or no access to individuals with disabilities.

== Application ==
Optical turnstiles are typically used in public spaces with high bidirectional human traffic, as they lack barriers and are typically used in conjunction with RFID authentication methods, allowing for faster personnel travel between secured areas. Optical turnstiles are further known for their aesthetic benefits over traditional turnstiles, as they are generally made from glass, and have slimmer bodies when in comparison to larger mechanical turnstiles.

During the COVID-19 pandemic, optical turnstiles were highly regarded, as many models supported contactless authentication methods and allowed for social distancing, while still enforcing physical security over designated zones.

Newest technological offerings in optical turnstiles include climb-over detection software, biometrics and QR code reader integrations inside the cabinet, and built-in elevator destination dispatch screens, often at 45-degree angle. Manufacturers can state their product reliability in terms of MCBF (Mean Cycles Between Failure) or in terms of warranties – usually between 1 and 5 years.

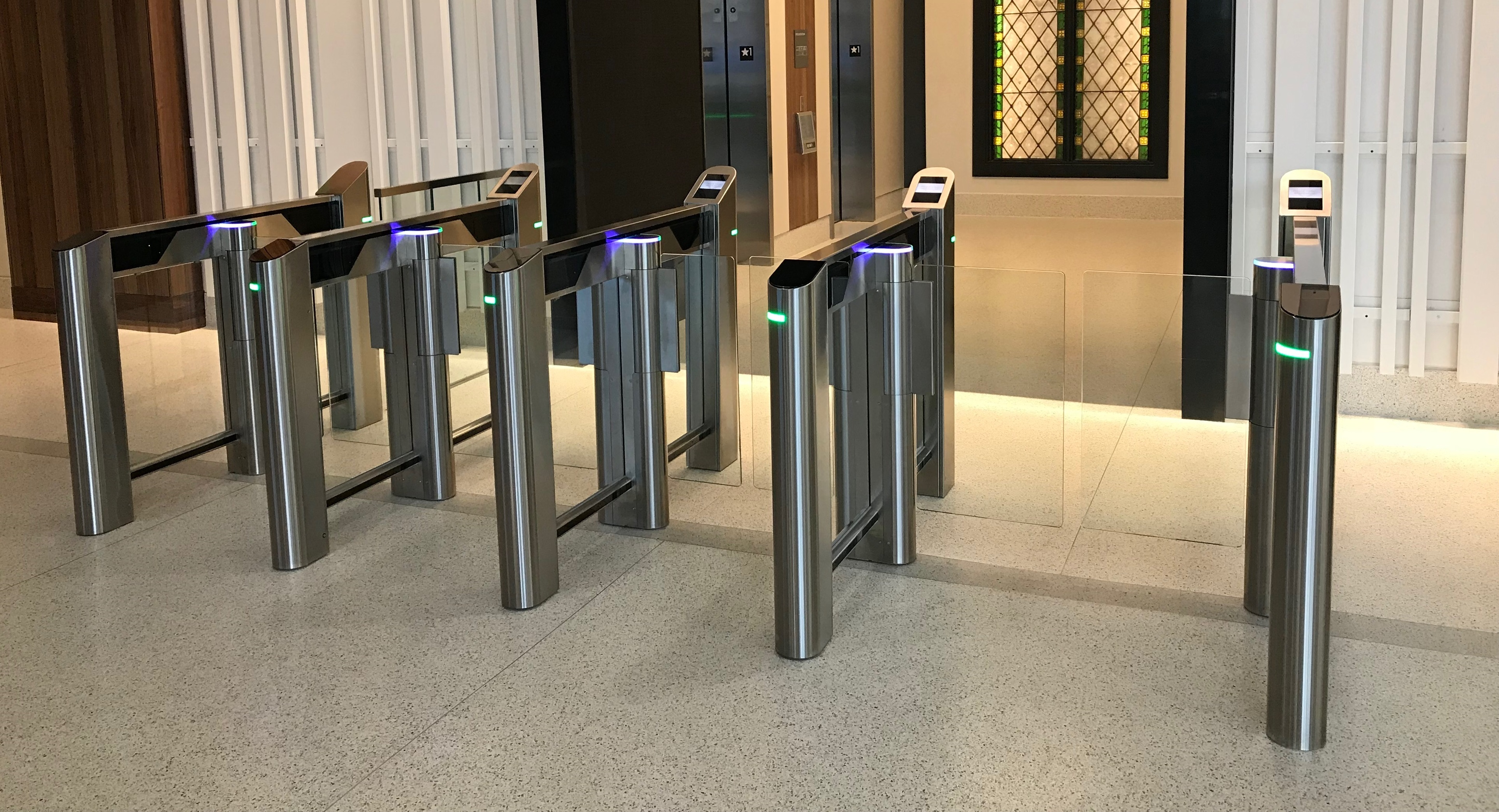
Slimlane swing glass optical turnstile with bar code readers and elevator destination dispatch screens

== See also ==
- Access control
- ID card
- Physical security
- Security
- Stile
- Turnstile
