= Academic mobility network =

International university exchange program

An academic mobility network is an informal association of universities and government programs that encourages the international exchange of higher education students (academic mobility).

== Background ==
Students choosing to study abroad (International students) aim to improve their own social and economic status by choosing to study in a nation with better systems of educations than their own. This creates movement of students, usually South to North and East to West. It is predicted that citizens of Asian nations, particularly India and China, will represent an increasing portion of the global international student population.

The total number of students enrolled in tertiary education abroad (international students) increased from 1.3 million in 1990, to 2 million in 2000, to more than 3 million in 2010 and to 4.3 million in 2011. The 2008 financial crisis did not decrease these figures.

The formation of academic mobility networks can be explained by changes in systems of education. The governments of some countries allocated funds to improve tertiary education for international students. For some countries, the presence of international students represents an indicator of quality of their education system. International students contribute to the economy of their chosen country of study.

In 2011, OECD countries were hosting seventy percent of international students. Within the OECD, almost half of international students were enrolled in one of the top five destinations for tertiary studies. These were United States (17 percent), United Kingdom (13 percent), Australia (6 percent), Germany (6 percent) and France (6 percent). International students prefer to study in English-speaking countries. Popular fields of study are the social sciences, business and law. Thirty percent of international students studied in these fields in 2011.

== Function ==
Academic mobility networks aim to assist students by providing cultural and social diversity, encouraging adaptability and independent thinking, allowing them to improve their knowledge of a foreign language and expand their professional network. By bringing international students, the network can provide educational institutions with a source of revenue and contribute to the nation's economy.

For example, in Canada, international student expenditure on tuition, accommodation and living expenses contributed more than CAD (Canadian dollar) 8 billion to the economy in 2010. International students also have a long-term economic effect. Their stay after graduation increases the domestic skilled labor market. In the 2008-2009 year, the rate of staying in OECD countries was 25 percent. In Australia, Canada, the Czech Republic, and France, the rate was greater than 30 percent. In 2005, 27 percent of international students from a European Union member state were employed in the UK six months after graduation. In Norway, 18 percent of students from outside the European Economic Area (EEA) who were studying between 1991 and 2005 stayed in the country; the corresponding number for EEA students was eight percent.

== United States ==
In the United States, educational exchange programs are generally managed by the Bureau of Educational and Cultural Affairs. Education in the United States consists of thousands of colleges and universities. Diversity in schools and subjects provides choice to international students.

After the terrorist attack of September 2001 international student enrolment in the United States declined for the first time in 30 years. It was more difficult to obtain visas, other countries competed for international student enrolments and anti-American sentiment increased.

== Europe ==
The Bologna process is a European initiative to promote international student mobility. Quality is a core element of the European Higher Education Area with an emphasis on multi-linguistic skills. Erasmus programme has supported European student exchanges since 1987. In 1987, around 3,000 students received grants to study for a period of 6 to 12 months at a host university of another of the twelve European member states. In 2012, the budget for the Erasmus Program was 129.1 billion Euros.
