= Barry Svigals =

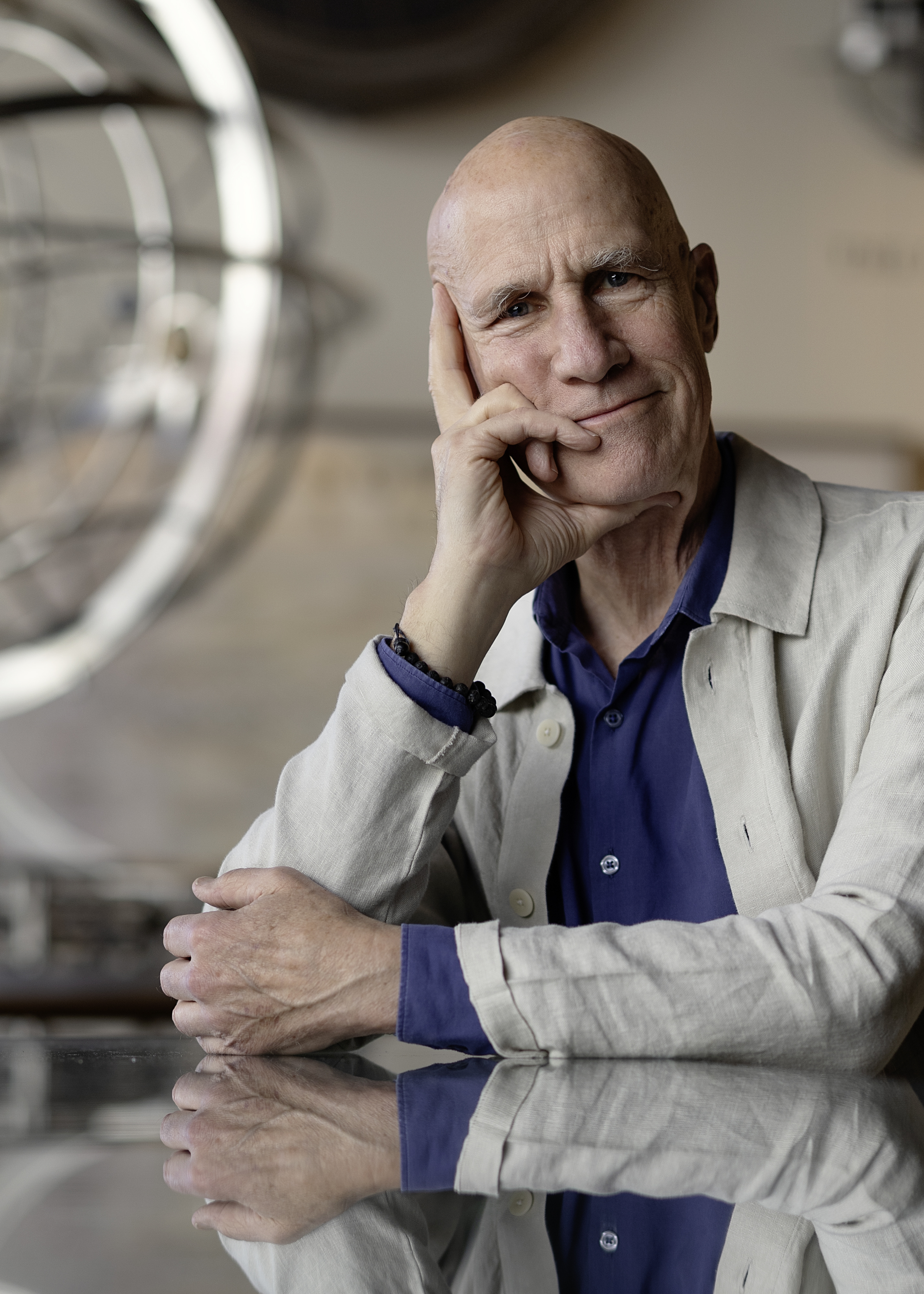
Barry Svigals by Christopher Michel

Barry Svigals, FAIA (born 1948) is a Connecticut-based architect and sculptor. He is the founder and Partner Emeritus of Svigals + Partners, an architectural design firm in New Haven, Connecticut. Svigals + Partners was founded in 1983 and has a staff of about 35. Svigals served on the faculty of Yale School of Architecture from 2003-2009, and has frequently acted there as a visiting critic.

== Education ==
Svigals is a graduate of Yale College and the Yale School of Architecture. He studied sculpture at the École nationale supérieure des beaux-arts de Paris (ENSBA)-(National School of Fine Arts in Paris). with Maurice Calka, Grand Prix de Rome, as Professor.

== Career ==
Svigals' early firm clients included the City of New Haven, Computer Associates International, Kodak, and residences for Garry Trudeau and Jane Pauley, New York, NY, and Keith Richards and Patti Hansen, Weston, CT.

In May 2007, Svigals was elevated to the Fellows of the American Institute of Architects (FAIA) for his contribution to the profession of architecture, specifically for "reawakening the tradition of figurative sculpture in architecture". Major buildings completed by the firm that include large-scale sculptural works by Mr. Svigals include the Carroll School of Management (Fulton Hall) at Boston College, the Center for Undergraduate Education at University of Connecticut in Storrs, the New Academic Center at Albertus Magnus College, and several public schools in New Haven. In 2011, Svigals created the DeLauro Family Table, a sculpture commissioned by the City of New Haven to honor Congresswoman Rosa DeLauro and her parents which is situated in Wooster Square, New Haven, CT.

Mr. Svigals and Svigals + Partners gained national prominence in 2014 with the redesign of the Sandy Hook School in Newtown, CT following the Sandy Hook Elementary School shooting. For this project, the firm was awarded the 2017 AGC Build New England Grand Honor Award, the 2017 CBC Project Team Award K-12 Category, the 2017 CMAA Power of Community Award, the 2017 CTGBC Energize CT Award of Excellence, the 2017 ENR Regional Best Projects K-12 Education Category, the 2016 American Institute of Architects Connecticut Chapter Design Award Built Project, Honorable Mention, the 2016 CMAA Project Achievement Award Building over $25M, the 2016 CREW CT Annual CT Real Estate Awards Best in Class, Education, and the 2016 CREW CT Annual CT Real Estate Awards People’s Choice. Other notable firm projects under Mr. Svigals' leadership include: Engineering & Science University Magnet School, New Haven, CT (awarded the 2018 CBC Project Team Awards K-12 First Place); the John S. Martinez School, New Haven, CT (awarded the 2008 American Association of School Administrators / American Institute of Architects / Council of Educational Facility Planners Citation Honor and the 2005 Connecticut Building Congress Project Team Award First Place); the Yale University School of Medicine Sterling Hall of Medicine, New Haven, CT (awarded the 2007 Connecticut Building Congress Project Team Award First Place); the Schwab Center for Information Technology, Norwalk Community College, Norwalk, CT (awarded the 2004 American School & University Louis I. Kahn Citation / Main Winner); and the Edgewood Avenue K-8 Arts Magnet School, New Haven, CT (awarded the 2002 Golden Trowel Award).

His firm is also known for its scientific laboratories, including many for Yale University, Science Park, and Connecticut biotechnology firms.

In 2019, Mr. Svigals was appointed to be a Fellow at the Hasso Plattner Institute of Design, better known as the d.school, at Stanford University to "Re-Imagine School Safety."

== References in Doonesbury ==
While at Yale, Svigals was a roommate of Garry Trudeau, creator of the Doonesbury comic strip, and he has been mentioned in the strip several times. For instance, the December 28, 1992 strip features a reference to Barry Svigals as trying to bribe character Zonker Harris to publicly mention his name.
