= Virtual mobility =

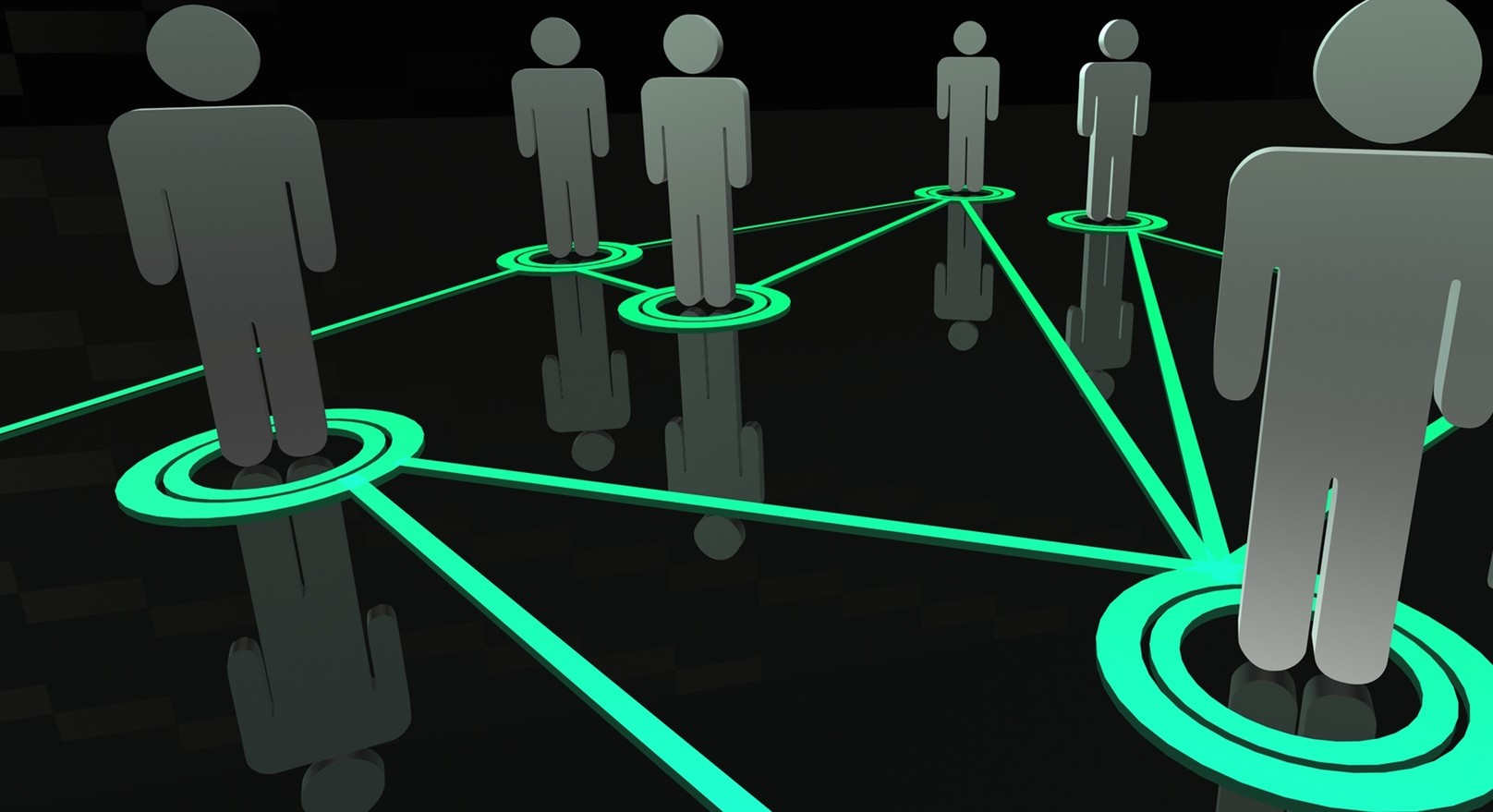
Virtual mobility- illustration

Virtual mobility refers to students and teachers in higher education using another institution outside their own country to study or teach for a limited time, without physically leaving their home. It complements physical mobility in which students travel to study abroad, such as within the Erasmus Programme. The two forms of mobility together constitute academic mobility. Student and teacher mobility are perceived as important quality issues in higher education.

Virtual mobility has been defined as an activity that offers access to courses and study schemes in a foreign country and allows for communication activities with teachers and fellow students abroad via the new information and communication technologies.

Striving for a European educational space, the European Ministers of Education consider virtual mobility as a necessary addition to the traditional ways of studying abroad that require travelling. In Europe, databases like Educontact provide students with an overview of available courses.

The public policy background is to be found, e.g. in the Leuven declaration on Mobility, by 46 European Higher education ministers.

A non-commercial guide to virtual mobility is suitable for universities and schools that start with virtual mobility.

== See also ==
- Academic mobility
