= Academic mobility =

Act of moving to an academic institution in another country

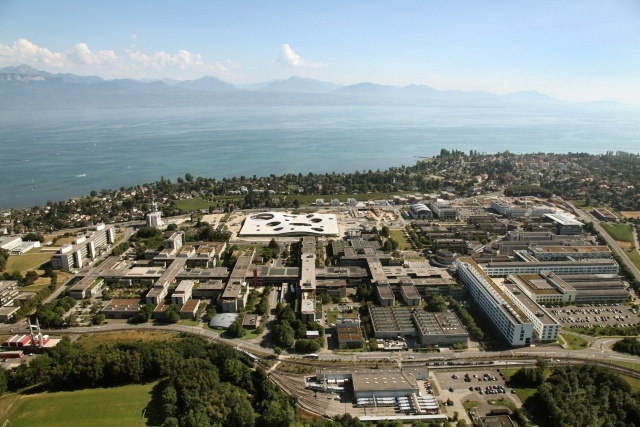
The Lausanne campus. Switzerland is the country with the world's highest proportion of foreign researchers.

Academic mobility refers to students and researchers in higher education moving to another institution inside or outside of their own country to study or teach for a limited time.

The Bologna process regulates academic mobility within European higher education area.

Mobile students are usually divided into two groups: Free-movers are students who travel entirely on their own initiative, while programme students use exchange programmes at a department, faculty, institution, or national level (such as Erasmus, Nordplus or Fulbright). Nowadays, the traditional Erasmus exchange (which involves travelling) has been complemented with virtual mobility, or Virtual Erasmus, in which students from different countries may study together without leaving their home.

== Students ==
=== Background ===
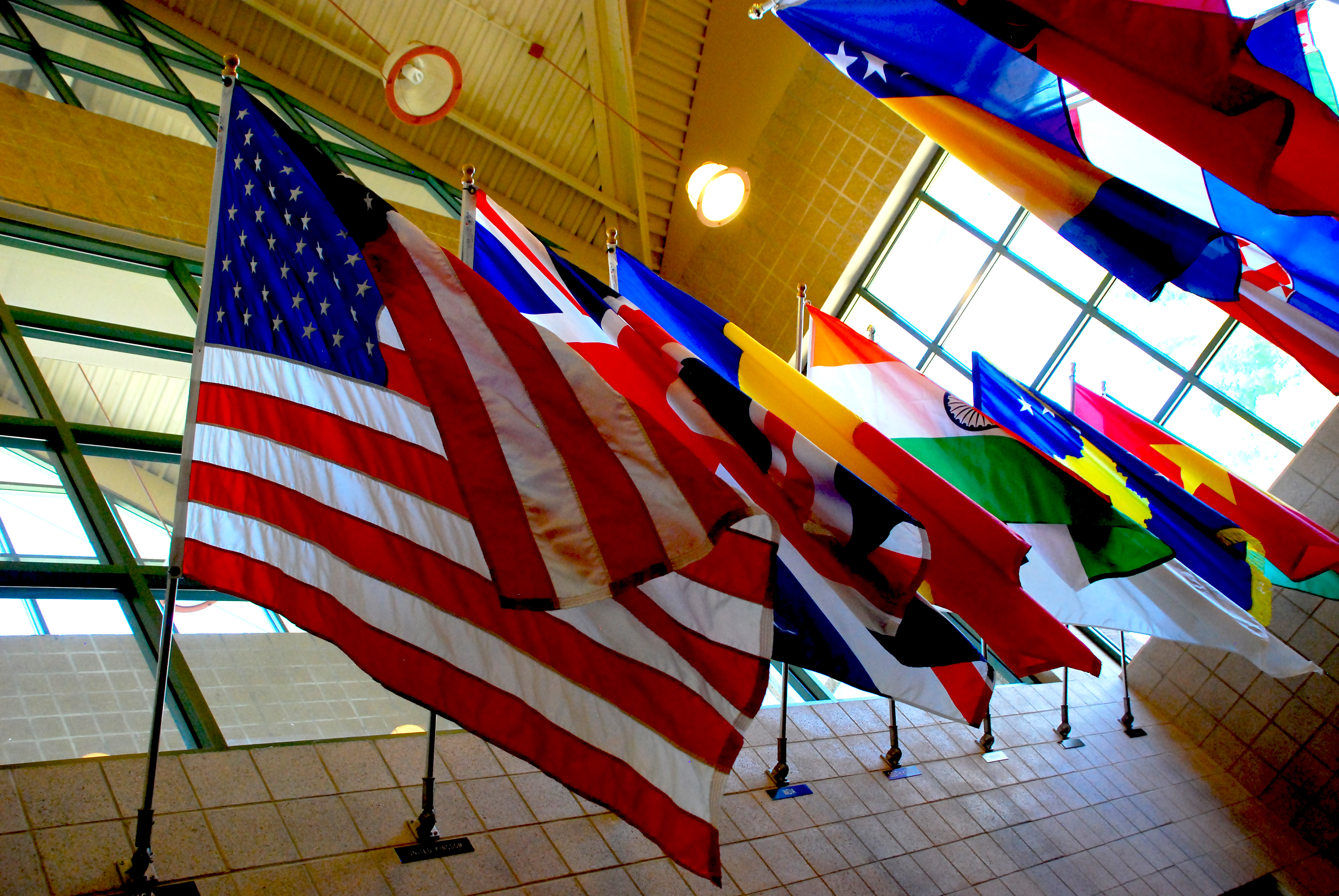
15% of Westminster College student body is international students, representing 71 different countries.

According to data from the Organisation for Economic Co-operation and Development (OECD), the mobility of international students has significantly increased in the past four decades, from 250,000 in 1965 to approximately 3.7 million in 2011. These statistics show the academic mobility of international students that aim for a degree rather than short-term "study abroad" education. UNESCO suggests that there are over 2.7 million students studying in a country other than their origin country. The group of Asian students is the largest constituent part of all students who enrolled in the overseas schools. They make up 45 percent of total of international students in OECD countries and 52 percent of total in non-OECD countries.

=== Barrier ===
Most mobile students suffer from many barriers both in their lives and academic activities. For example, Sanchez, Fornerino and Zhang did a survey among 477 U.S., French and Chinese students who studied in their home countries. This survey suggests that the students from these three countries face or fear barriers such as family barriers, financial barriers, psychological barriers and social barriers. The psychological barriers relate to aspects such as homesickness or the fear of the new environment and the social barriers usually relate to friends and family. Different students are various in degree of these problem.

For the credit mobile students, they will meet some specific academic difficulties. A survey by Klahr and Ratti emphasizes the importance of the lack of recognition of periods abroad and credit transfer. Besides, insufficient knowledge of academic prerequisites and qualifications of various countries, differences in the structure of the academic term, disparities in the times at which examinations are taken, these are all common problem of credit mobile students when they engage in academic activities. Moreover, the lack of foreign language skills is considered as another big barrier to most of the mobile students, not only the credit mobile students.

Female mobile students have some particular barriers because of their gender role. The female mobile students, especially who are in older in age, are tied to a specific spatial context by private responsibilities. For example, partnering and children will have a great effect on the female's academic mobility. Some findings from qualitative interviews with researchers from Bulgaria and Poland confirmed the great significance of personal and family relationships for female's academic mobility, either as a barrier or as an incentive.

== Researchers ==
Researchers are employed on casualised temporary contracts in some universities, which force them to relocate around every three years when funding streams change, typically to another country. Historically this was done just one for a "postdoc" research project, but modern funding now devotes far more money to contract research than teaching posts, and so many researchers now face a whole career of living in this way. This often leads to the breakup of their families and friends and sometimes to mental health problems.

With 57% of its researchers coming from other countries, Switzerland is the country with the world highest proportion of foreign researchers. Canada, Australia, the United States, Sweden and the United Kingdom have between 30 and 50% of their researchers coming from foreign countries.

The Netherlands, Germany, Denmark, Belgium and France have between 10 and 30% of their researchers coming from foreign countries. Brazil, Spain, Japan, Italy and India have less than 10% of their researchers coming from foreign countries.

Switzerland and India are among the countries with the highest proportion of their researchers going to work in other countries.

== Digital Support for Mobility ==
=== EMREX (European Mobility Exchange) ===
In Europe, digital infrastructures have been developed to support the secure transfer and recognition of academic records between higher education institutions. One example is EMREX, a system that allows students to electronically transmit verified course and examination results across borders. The system has been adopted particularly in Nordic countries, where it is integrated into national higher education information systems, and is cited in reports on interoperability and student mobility as a practical measure to simplify administrative processes.

== See also ==
- Student exchange program
- Erasmus programme
- University Mobility in Asia and the Pacific
- Virtual mobility
- UNESCO
- Academic Mobility Network
