= Maurice Calka =

French-Polish sculptor and urbanist (1921–1999)

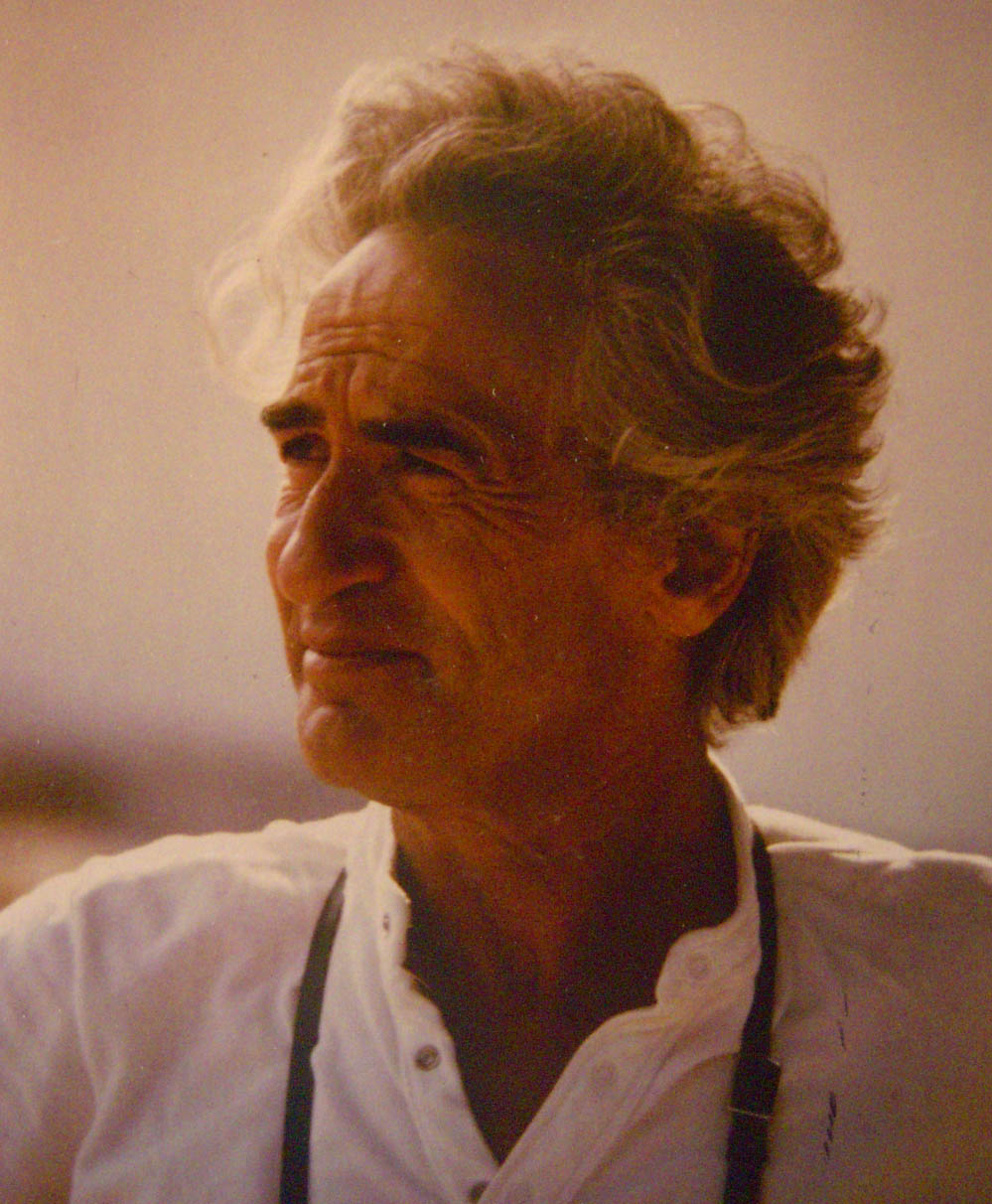
- Born: 10 January 1921; Łódź
- Died: 25 August 1999 (aged 78); Paris
- Alma mater: École des beaux-arts de Lille; Beaux-Arts de Paris
- Occupation: Designer, urban planner, sculptor
- Awards: Prix de Rome (1950)
- Website: ateliercalka.net

Maurice Calka (1921–1999) was a French sculptor, designer and urbanist from Łódź, Poland.

Calka was awarded the Grand Prix de Rome in 1950. He was a professor at the École nationale supérieure des beaux-arts de Paris (ENSBA)-(National School of Fine Arts in Paris). He was a winner of a prize from the French architecture academy.

During his lifetime two of his works achieved worldwide renown. The first, made of stone, is in Addis Ababa, Ethiopia and is ten metres high, a statue of the Lion of Judah, ordered by the Emperor Haile Selassie, who saw this as an opportunity to give a view of Africa entering modern times in 1955. This sculpture, easily identified by its silhouette, became a cultural symbol of Afrocentrism. His second piece is a molded plastic desk, the "Boomerang Desk" – based on a polished stone and designed at the end of the sixties – as a limited edition. This piece of furniture was the forerunner of the objects designed during the rest of the following decade. It has been presented in numerous publications and exhibitions.

During his lifetime Calka created over fifty monumental pieces of work of all types, most created in his Paris workshop on Rue Raffet. His involvement in public art and the urban space led the sculptor to contribute to several architectural projects, fifteen of which were completed.

== Biography ==
Calka was raised in Lille, in northern France. He initially studied Engineering, but was attracted to Art, and entered the Lille School of Fine Arts at age 16, where he remained for three years. The director of the school at that time was Robert Mallet-Stevens, who noted Calka's ability, and gave him his first commission: a huge bas-relief for the press pavilion at the Lille Social Progress expo in 1939.

Calka passed the Paris Fine Arts School's competitive examination. In 1942, after the Allies had retaken North Africa, he decided to join the Free French Forces of General Charles de Gaulle. He clandestinely crossed the Pyrenees and enlisted (Evadés de France, Miranda's camp). He remained in the military from 1942 to 1945, being demobilized at Speyer near the end of 1945.

Calka returned to the study of sculpture at the Paris Fine-Arts school, under professors Marcel Gimond and Alfred Janniot. He won the Premier Grand Prix de Rome in 1950, which provided him the opportunity to work in the Villa Médicis for four years. While there he studied Urbanism.

In 1954 Calka received his first large urban-art commission: he completed a stone Lion of Judah in front of the National Theater (Henri Chomette, architect) in Addis Ababa. The radical modernity of this sculpture was endorsed by Emperor Haile Selassie himself. Back in France, he worked with urbanist Robert Auzelle, completing several pieces for him such as a giant sculpture for Clamart cemetery (1957) (published in National Geographic) and a large sculpture for Joncherolle cemetery (1974) (published in "Concrete Quarterly" – July/September 1977).

Calka completed 47 works of Public Art, including sculptures, bas-reliefs, and polychromatic works.

In 2004, a large metal bas-relief for the Church St Jean l'Evangéliste of Dole which covers one wall of the building was completed from his designs.

Calka was named "Patrimoine du XX siècle" by the Ministry of Culture (26 March 2007).

== Influence on modern art ==
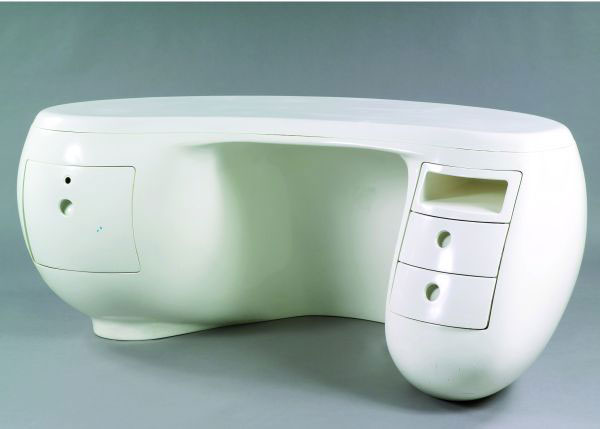
Boomerang Desk

By the end of the 1960s Calka was deeply immersed in design, working with new materials (plastic and fiberglass). Of his work two results are of special note: the Boomerang Desk, and a monumental version, the PDG. An example of this desk sold for $480,000 at a 2008 art auction held by Christie's in New York City.

Calka is considered a pioneer in the use of these new materials. Other Calka works which have often been exhibited include "Les Années Pop"- Georges Pompidou Center, "Tomorrow-Now" – Art Modern Museum Grand-Duc Jean, Luxembourg, etc.

Calka has worked on several architecture projects:

- Expérimental chalet made of wood and fiberglass; Gerard Grandval architect, Rousseau engineer – (La Plagne, 1970)
- The Hôtel de région of St Denis de la Réunion with Marc Van Nuwenborg (groupeIV) Architect -(La Reunion, 1985)
- Cemetery of the city of Le Port – (La Reunion, 1990)
- Several education buildings in USA with Barry Svigals architect.

In 2003 several Calka works entered the collections of the "Musée National d'Art Moderne" – Centre Georges Pompidou.

== Collaborators ==
- Serge Fabre – Sculptor
- Katherine Lavocat – Sculptor, painter.
