= Jerome Svigals =

American engineer and author(1927–2018)

- Born: June 8, 1927; Bronx, New York
- Died: November 11, 2018 (aged 91); San Jose, California
- Occupation: engineer
- Employer(s): US Army, RCA, IBM
- Spouse: Lias (Lois) Joan Kahn (1930-75) Pauline Elizardo (m. 1977/03/06)

Jerome Svigals (June 8, 1927 – November 11, 2018) was an American engineer and author instrumental in the development of magnetic stripes on credit cards and in the adoption of smart card technology.

Svigals was a member of the SPREAD task force that proposed what became the IBM System 360.
