= Identity document =

Document used to identify a person

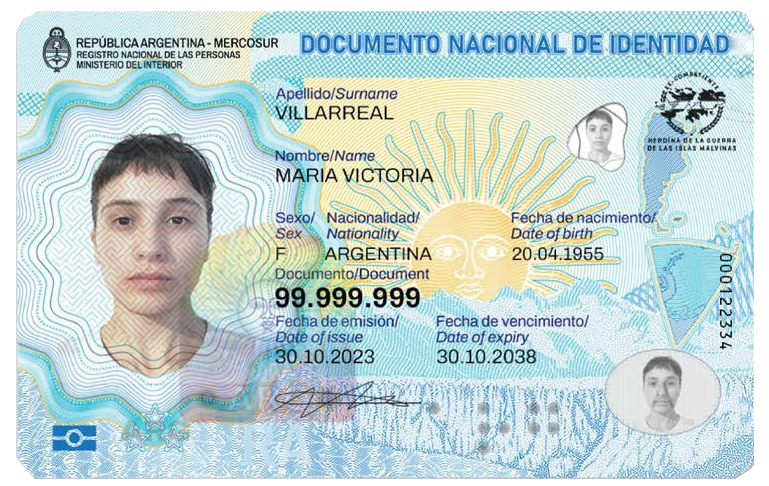
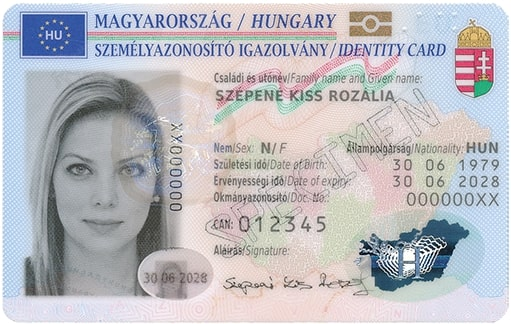
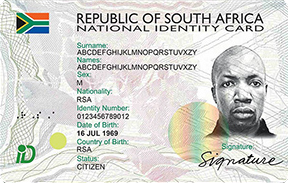
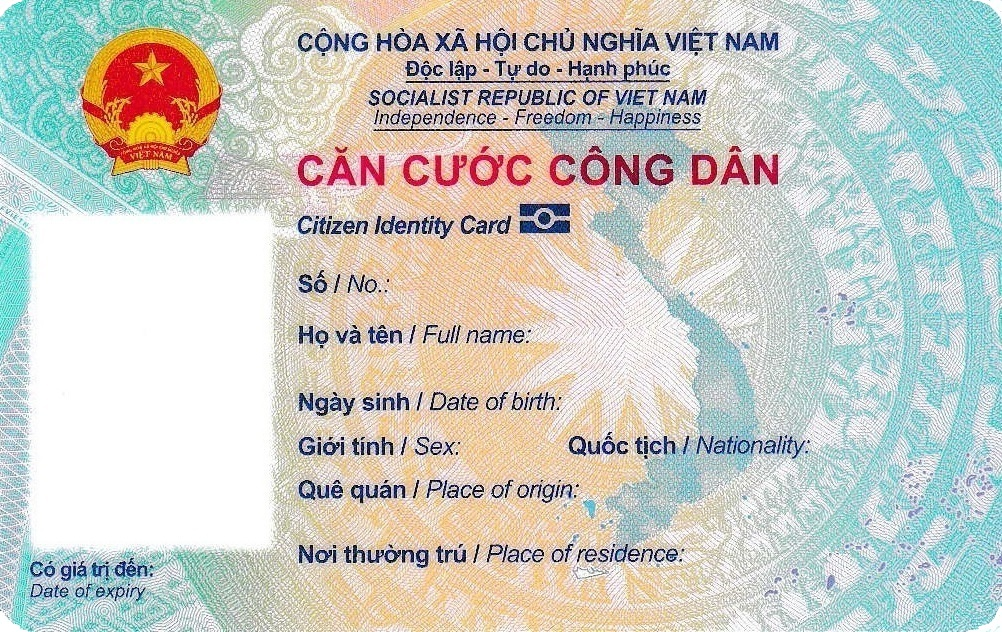
Examples of identity documents (cards) from Argentina, Hungary, South Africa and Vietnam

An identity document (abbreviated as ID) is a document proving a person's identity.

If the identity document is a plastic card it is called an identity card (abbreviated as IC or ID card). When the identity document incorporates a photographic portrait, it is called a photo ID. In some countries, identity documents may be compulsory to have or carry.

The identity document is used to connect a person to information about the person, often in a database. The connection between the identity document and database is based on personal information present on the document, such as the bearer's full name, birth date, address, an identification number, card number, gender, citizenship and more. A unique national identification number is the most secure way, but some countries lack such numbers or do not show them on identity documents.

In the absence of an explicit identity document, other documents such as driver's license may be accepted in many countries for identity verification. Some countries do not accept driver's licenses for identification, often because in those countries they do not expire as documents and can be old or easily forged. Most countries accept passports as a form of identification. Some countries require all people to have an identity document available at all times. Many countries require all foreigners to have a passport or occasionally a national identity card from their home country available at any time if they do not have a residence permit in the country.

== History ==
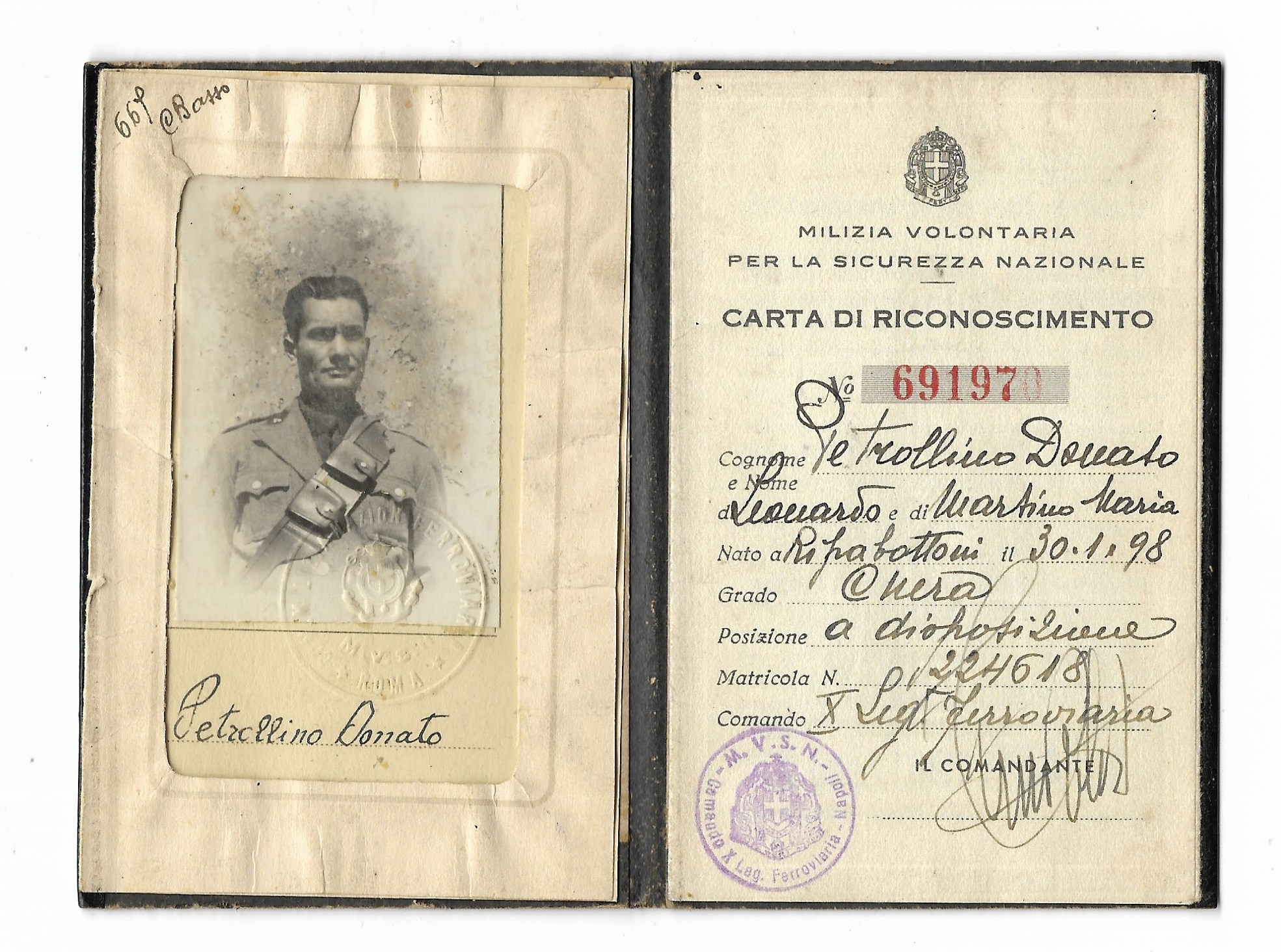
Italian identity card from 1941

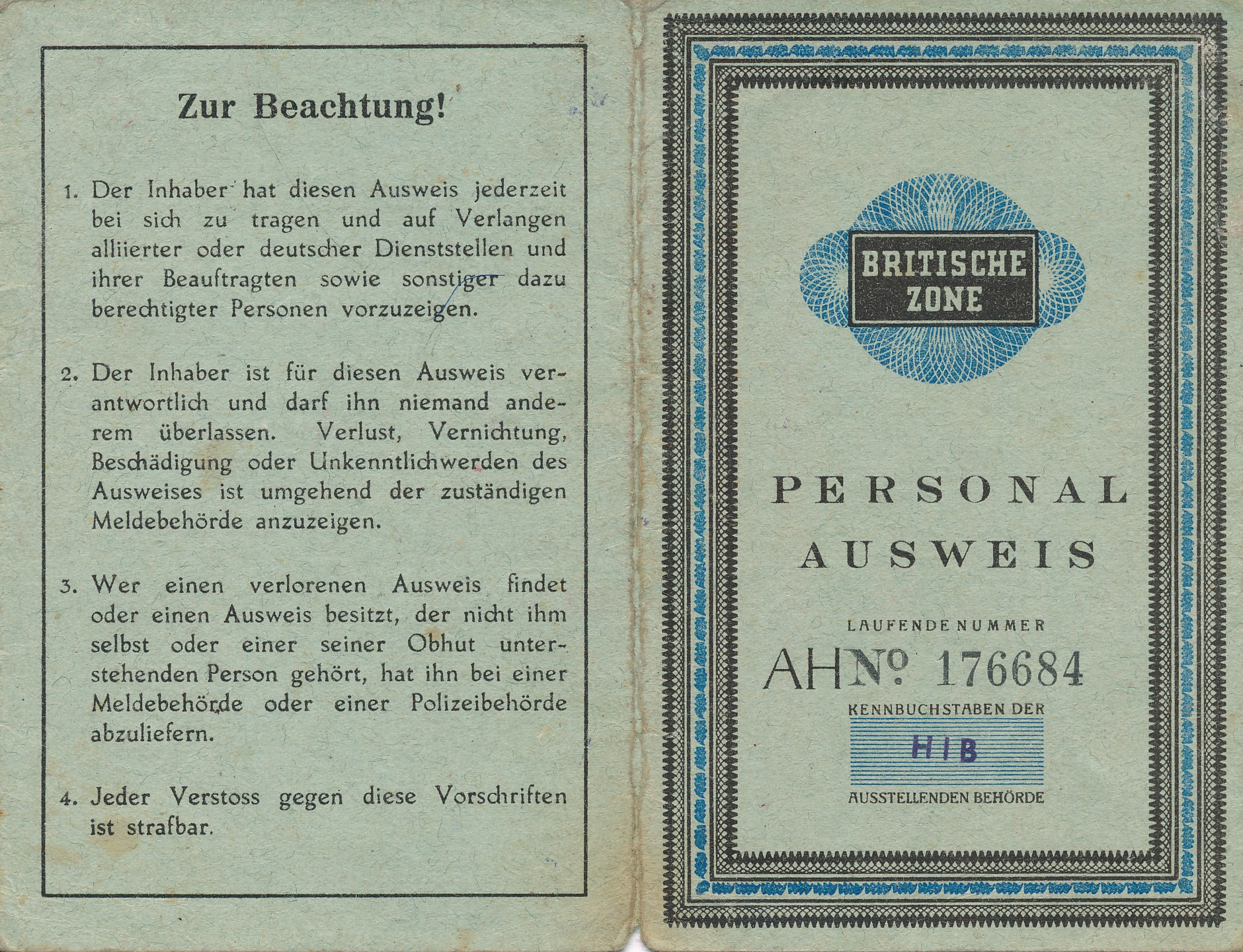
Identity document of the British occupation zone in Germany

A version of the passport considered to be the earliest identity document inscribed into law was introduced by King Henry V of England with the Safe Conducts Act 1414.

For the next 500 years up to the onset of the First World War, most people did not have or need an identity document.

Photographic identification appeared in 1876 but it did not become widely used until the early 20th century when photographs became part of passports and other ID documents, all of which came to be referred to as "photo IDs" in the late 20th century. Both Australia and Great Britain, for example, introduced the requirement for a photographic passport in 1915 after the so-called Lody spy scandal.

The shape and size of identity cards were standardized in 1985 by ISO/IEC 7810. Some modern identity documents are smart cards that include a hard-to-forge embedded integrated circuit standardized in 1988 by ISO/IEC 7816. New technologies allow identity cards to contain biometric information, such as a photograph, face; hand, or iris measurements; or fingerprints. Many countries issue electronic identity cards.

== Adoption ==
Law enforcement officials claim that identity cards make surveillance and the search for criminals easier and therefore support the universal adoption of identity cards. In countries that do not have a national identity card, there is concern about the projected costs and potential abuse of high-tech smartcards.

In many countries – especially English-speaking countries such as Australia, Canada, Ireland, New Zealand, the United Kingdom, and the United States – there are no government-issued compulsory identity cards for all citizens. Ireland's Public Services Card is not considered a national identity card by the Department of Employment Affairs and Social Protection (DEASP), but many say it is in fact becoming that, and without public debate or even a legislative foundation.

There is debate in these countries about whether such cards and their centralised databases constitute an infringement of privacy and civil liberties. Most criticism is directed towards the possibility of abuse of centralised databases storing sensitive data. A 2006 survey of UK Open University students concluded that the planned compulsory identity card under the Identity Cards Act 2006 coupled with a central government database generated the most negative response among several options. None of the countries listed above mandate identity documents, but they have de facto equivalents since these countries still require proof of identity in many situations. For example, all vehicle drivers must have a driving licence, and young people may need to use specially issued "proof of age cards" when purchasing alcohol.

=== Arguments for ===
Arguments for identity documents as such:

- In order to avoid mismatching people and to fight fraud, there should be a secure way to prove a person's identity.

Arguments for national identity documents:

- If using only private alternatives, such as ID cards issued by banks, the inherent lack of consistency regarding issuance policies can lead to downstream problems. For example, in Sweden private companies such as banks (citing security reasons) refused to issue ID cards to individuals without a Swedish card or Swedish passport. This forced the government to start issuing national cards. It is also harder to control information usage by private companies, such as when credit card issuers or social media companies map purchase behaviour in order to assist ad targeting.

=== Arguments against ===
Arguments against identity documents as such:

- The development and administrative costs of an identity card system can be high. Figures from £30 to £90 or even higher were suggested for the abandoned UK ID card. In countries such as Chile the identity card is paid for by each person up to £6; in other countries, such as France or Venezuela, the ID card is free. This, however, does not disclose the true cost of issuing ID cards as some additional portion may be borne by taxpayers in general.

Arguments against national identity documents:

- Rather than relying on government-issued ID cards, U.S. federal policy has encouraged a variety of identification systems that already exist, such as driver's or firearms licences or private cards.

Arguments against overuse or abuse of identity documents:

- Cards reliant on a centralized database can be used to track someone's physical movements and private life, thus infringing on personal freedom and privacy. The proposed British ID card proposes a series of linked databases managed by private sector firms. The management of disparate linked systems across a range of institutions and any number of personnel is alleged to be a security disaster in the making.
- If race is displayed on mandatory ID documents, this information can lead to racial profiling.

== See also ==
- Aadhaar
- Access badge
- Anthropometry
- National biometric id card
- Campus card
- Homeland card
- Home Return Permit
- ID card printer
- Identity Cards Act 2006
- List of identity card policies by country
- Magnetic stripe card
- NO2ID
- Pass laws
- Physical security
- Police certificate
- Proximity card
- Self-sovereign identity
- Warrant card
