= Perspecsys =

Software company in Canada

Perspecsys Inc.
- Company type: Privately held company
- Industry: Cloud Computing, Cloud Security, Encryption, Data Tokenization
- Founded: 1 January 2009
- Headquarters: Toronto, Canada and Tysons Corner, Virginia USA
- Number of locations: 4
- Products: Cloud security software
- Website: perspecsys.com

Perspecsys Inc. is a cloud computing security company Founded by Terry and Lynda Woloszyn, on July 6 2006 that provides cloud data protection software. Perspecsys has offices in the Toronto area; Tysons Corner, Virginia; San Francisco, California; London, England; Paris, France; and Berlin, Germany.

Perspecsys specializes in cloud data privacy, data residency/sovereignty, and data security software that enables compliance with industry regulations and directives, and security requirements when adopting cloud. Banking and financial services, healthcare, retail, and government entities must adhere to strict guidelines when handling sensitive personal data in cloud applications that include: PCI DSS, ITAR, FERPA, HIPAA, and HITECH.

== Technology ==
The AppProtex Cloud Data Protection Gateway secures data in software as a service and platform as a service provider applications through the use of encryption or tokenization. Gartner refers to this type of technology as a cloud encryption gateway, and categorizes providers of this technology as cloud access security brokers. The United States Patent and Trademark Office (USPTO) has granted Perspecsys U.S. Patent No. 9,021,135 for its System and Method for Tokenization of Data for Storage in a Cloud.

The main component of the cloud encryption gateway is the AppProtex Cloud Data Protection Gateway Server, which acts as an intercepting software proxy. The gateway server provides the core data privacy, residency, and security services for the gateway. AppProtex Discovery & Analyze capabilities allow visibility into information users are sharing with cloud applications.

Users may define encryption, and tokenization options at the field-level. The cloud data protection gateway allows encryption with any third-party JCA/JCE-compliant cryptographic module, including FIPS 140-2 (Federal Information Processing Standard) validated modules. Cloud data is secured, and end-users maintain full functionality, such as the ability to search, sort, and e-mail using data that has been either encrypted or tokenized.

The data that flows between the cloud application, and the end user is interpreted by the Gateway. For cloud applications that feature email, the AppProtex Communications Server can enable the secure transfer of email. Additionally, AppProtex Server facilitates the deployment of the cloud security gateway via IaaS partners such as Amazon Web Services, CSC, and Fujitsu.

Perspecsys is a Salesforce AppExchange Partner and provides tokenization or encryption of Salesforce.com, Chatter, Force.com, and Wave Analytics Cloud Data. The AppProtex Cloud Data Protection Gateway secures cloud data across cloud applications, including Oracle CRM on Demand, Oracle Fusion CRM, ServiceNow, SuccessFactors, AppExtremes, and Xactly Incent.

== Standards ==
Perspecsys cloud encryption gateway uses either tokenization or encryption for cloud security. Its tokenization option was evaluated by Coalfire, a PCI DSS Qualified Security Assessor (QSA) and a FedRAMP-accredited Third Party Assessment Organization (3PAO), to ensure that it adheres to industry guidelines. The gateway also allows encryption modules from other third-party providers (such as McAfee, Voltage Security, SafeNet, and Symantec) to encrypt cloud data, including modules that are FIPS 140-2 (Federal Information Processing Standard) validated, issued by the National Institute of Standards and Technology (NIST).

== Funding & Acquisition ==
In May 2013, Perspecsys secured $12 million in Series B funding, co-led by Paladin Capital Group and Ascent Venture Partners and joined by return backer Intel Capital and other existing institutional investors. Together with Series A funding, this new round of financing brings the total investment in Perspecsys to over $20 million. Perspecsys’ Series A round of funding totaled $8 million and was led by Intel Capital, the global investment branch of technology company, Intel in May, 2011. GrowthWorks, and MaRS Investment Accelerator Fund have also invested in Perspecsys.

On July 30, 2015 Blue Coat Systems announced it had acquired Perspecsys in order to expand its cloud security offerings. The acquisition price is estimated to be $180–200M.

Subsequently on the 12th of June 2016, Symantec Corporation announced that it would be acquiring Blue Coat Systems for approximately $4.65 Billion in cash. Greg Clark, Chief Executive Officer of Blue Coat, was appointed Chief Executive Officer of Symantec.
