= Payment card =

Card issued by a financial institution

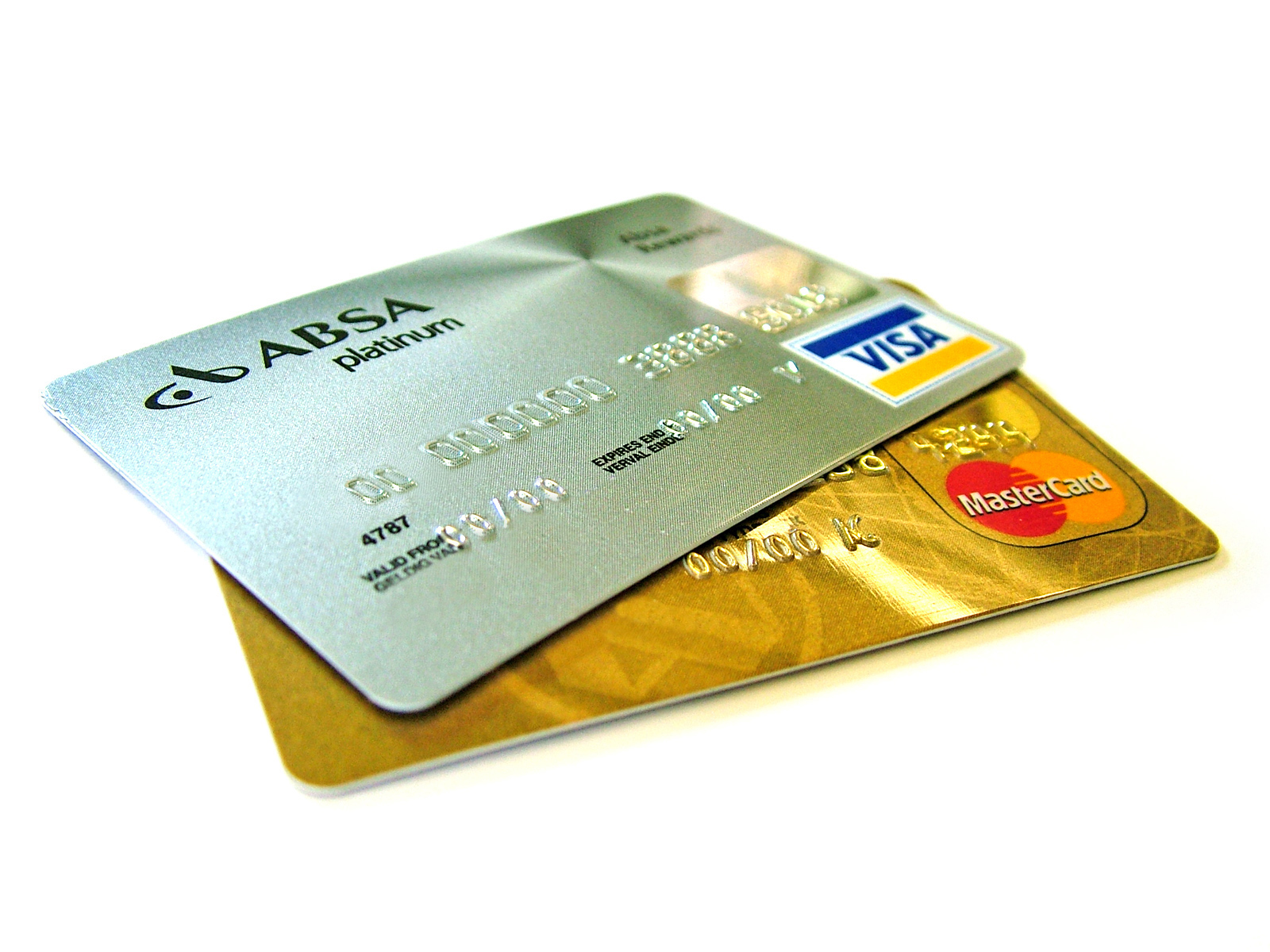
Two examples of credit cards

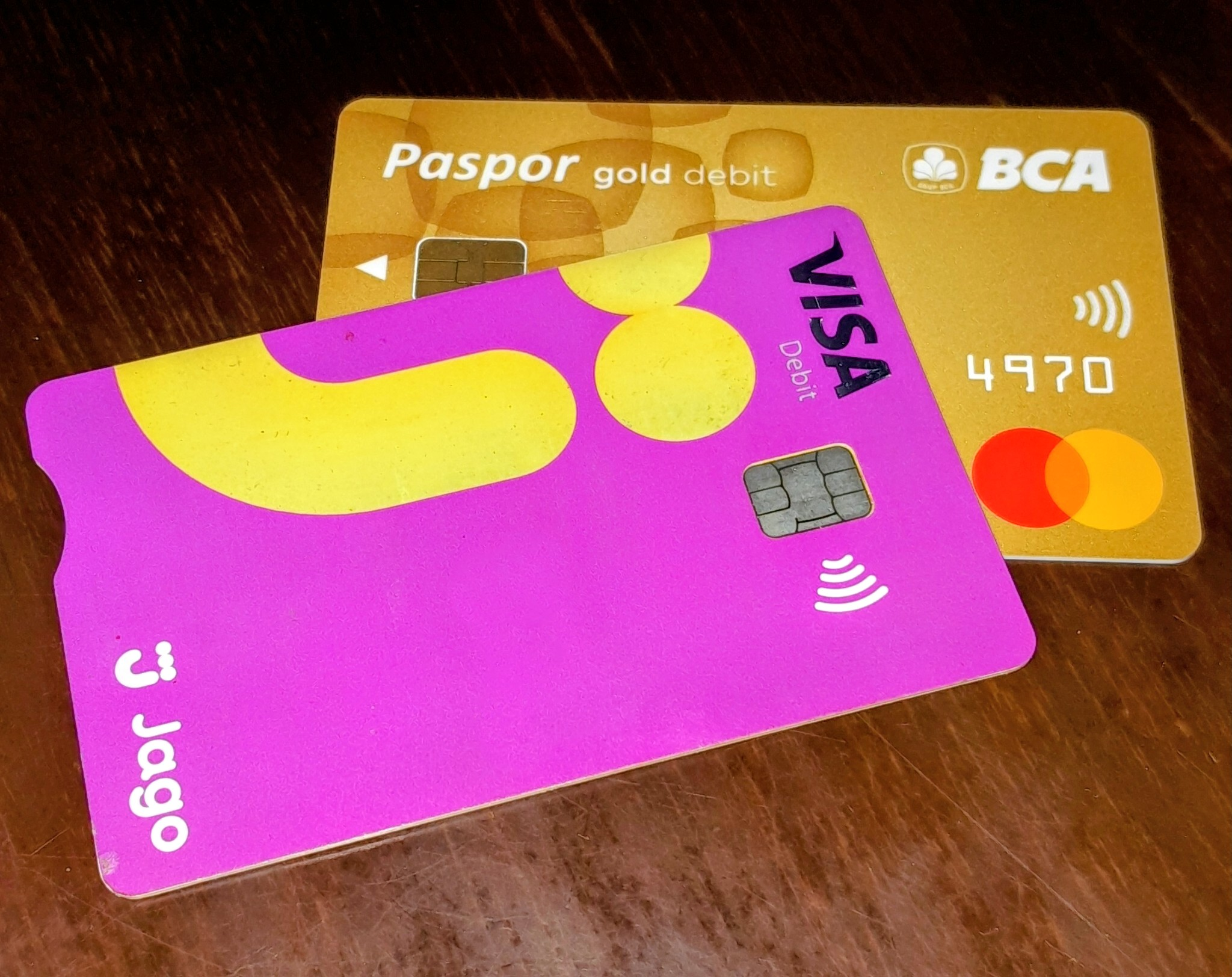
Two examples of debit cards

Payment cards are part of a payment system issued by financial institutions, such as banks, to a customer that enables its owner (the cardholder) to access the funds in the customer's designated bank accounts, or through a credit account and make payments by electronic transfer with a payment terminal and access automated teller machines (ATMs). Such cards are known by a variety of names, including bank cards, ATM cards, client cards, key cards or cash cards.

There are a number of types of payment cards, the most common being credit cards, debit cards, charge cards, and stored-value cards. Most commonly, a payment card is electronically linked to an account or accounts belonging to the cardholder. These accounts may be deposit accounts or loan or credit accounts, and the card is a means of authenticating the cardholder. However, stored-value cards store money on the card itself and are not necessarily linked to an account at a financial institution. The largest global card payment organizations are: UnionPay, Visa, Mastercard and American Express.

It can also be a smart card that contains a unique card number and some security information such as an expiration date or with a magnetic strip on the back enabling various machines to read and access information. Depending on the issuing bank and the preferences of the client, this may allow the card to be used as an ATM card, enabling transactions at automatic teller machines; or as a debit card, linked to the client's bank account and able to be used for making purchases at the point of sale; or as a credit card attached to a revolving credit line supplied by the bank. In 2017, there were 20.48 billion payment cards (mainly prepaid cards) in the world. By year-end 2024, general purpose and private-label credit, debit and prepaid cards in circulation worldwide numbered 27.76 billion.

== History ==
Historically, bank cards have also served the purpose of a cheque guarantee card, a now almost defunct system to guarantee cheques at point of sale.

The first bank cards were automated teller machine (ATM) cards issued by Barclays in London in 1967, and by Chemical Bank in Long Island, New York, in 1969. In 1972, Lloyds Bank issued the first bank card to feature an information-encoding magnetic strip, using a personal identification number (PIN) for security.

The smart card, which was introduced in the 1970s, was adapted for use as a payment card. Smart payment cards were introduced to the banking sector in 1979, and came into wider use in the mid-1980s.

== Card networks ==
In some banking networks, the two functions of ATM cards and debit cards are combined into a single card, simply called a "debit card" or also commonly a "bank card". These are able to perform banking tasks at ATMs and also make point-of-sale transactions, with both features using a PIN.

Canada's Interac and Europe's Debit Mastercard are examples of networks that link bank accounts with point-of-sale equipment.

Some debit card networks also started their lives as ATM card networks before evolving into full-fledged debit card networks, example of these networks are: Development Bank of Singapore (DBS)'s Network for Electronic Transfers (NETS) and Bank Central Asia (BCA)'s Debit BCA, both of them were later on adopted by other banks (with Prima Debit being the Prima interbank network version of Debit BCA).

== Technical features ==
Payment cards are usually plastic cards, 85.60 mm × 53.98 mm (3.370 in × 2.125 in) and rounded corners with a radius of 2.88–3.48 mm, in accordance with ISO/IEC 7810#ID-1 standard.

They usually also have a unique card number conforming with the ISO/IEC 7812 numbering standard, the cardholder’s name and the card expiry date, in addition to other security features. Historically this text was embossed to produce an imprint on multi-part paper forms, and some cards are still produced this way.

== Types ==
Payment cards have features in common, as well as distinguishing features. Types of payment cards can be distinguished on the basis of the features of each type of card, including:

=== Credit card ===
In the US and other countries, a credit card is linked to a revolving line of credit (with a credit limit) created by the issuer of the credit card for the cardholder on which the cardholder can draw (i.e. borrow), either for payment to a merchant for a purchase or as a cash advance to the cardholder. Most credit cards are issued by or through local banks or credit unions, but some non-bank financial institutions also offer cards directly to the public.

The cardholder can either repay the full outstanding balance or a lesser amount by the payment due date. The amount paid cannot be less than the ”minimum payment,” either a fixed amount or a percentage of the outstanding balance. Interest is charged on the portion of the balance not paid off by the due date. The rate of interest and method of calculating the charge vary between credit cards, even for different types of cards issued by the same company. Many credit cards can also be used to take cash advances through ATMs, which also attract interest charges, usually calculated from the date of cash withdrawal. Some merchants charge a fee for purchases by credit card, as they will be charged a fee by the card issuer.

In other countries such as France, the distinction between debit and credit cards is based on when the customer's account is debited for the transaction. A debit card debits the customer's account as the transaction is made, while a credit card debits it at the end of the month automatically.

What is called a credit card in the United States - meaning the customer has a bill to pay at the end of the month - does not exist in the French banking system. However, credit companies can provide these cards, but they are separate from the regular banking system. In this case, the consumer decides the maximum amount, making it impossible to fall into debt by forgetting to pay a credit card bill.

Credit scores or credit history do not exist in France, and therefore the need to build a credit history does not exist. Personal information cannot be shared among banks, which means there is no centralized system for tracking creditworthiness. The only centralized system in France is for individuals who file for bankruptcy or those who have not repaid credit or issued checks without sufficient funds. This system is handled by the Banque de France.

=== Debit card ===
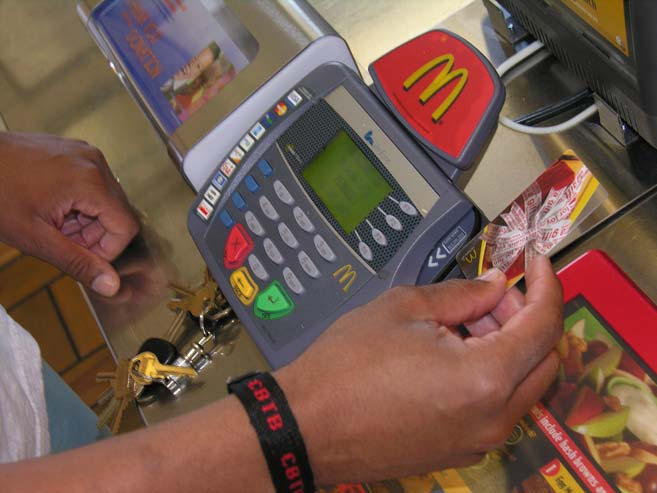
Purchasing by debit card

With a debit card (also known as a bank card, check card or plastic card) when a cardholder makes a purchase, funds are withdrawn directly either from the cardholder's bank account, or from the remaining balance on the card, instead of the holder repaying the money at a later date. In some cases, the "cards" are designed exclusively for use on the Internet, and so there is no physical card.

The use of debit cards has become widespread in many countries and has overtaken use of cheques, and in some instances cash transactions, by volume. Like credit cards, debit cards are used widely for telephone and internet purchases.

Debit cards can also allow instant withdrawal of cash, acting as the ATM card, and as a cheque guarantee card. Merchants can also offer "cashback"/"cashout" facilities to customers, where a customer can withdraw cash along with their purchase. Merchants usually do not charge a fee for purchases by debit card.

=== Charge card ===
With charge cards, the cardholder is required to pay the full balance shown on the statement, which is usually issued monthly, by the payment due date. It is a form of short-term loan to cover the cardholder's purchases, from the date of the purchase and the payment due date, which may typically be up to 55 days. Interest is usually not charged on charge cards and there is usually no limit on the total amount that may be charged. If payment is not made in full, this may result in a late payment fee, the possible restriction of future transactions, and perhaps the cancellation of the card.

=== ATM card ===
An ATM card (known under a number of names) is any card that can be used in automated teller machines (ATMs) for transactions such as deposits, cash withdrawals, obtaining account information, and other types of transactions, often through interbank networks. Cards may be issued solely to access ATMs, and most debit or credit cards may also be used at ATMs, but most charge and proprietary cards cannot.

The use of a credit card to withdraw cash at an ATM is treated differently to an POS transaction, usually attracting interest charges from the date of the cash withdrawal. The use of a debit card usually does not attract interest. Third party ATM owners may charge a fee for the use of their ATM.

Most payment cards, such as debit and credit cards, can also function as ATM cards, although ATM-only cards are also available. Most charge and proprietary cards cannot be used as ATM cards. The use of a credit card to withdraw cash at an ATM is treated differently to a POS transaction, usually attracting interest charges from the date of the cash withdrawal. Interbank networks allow the use of ATM cards at ATMs of private operators and financial institutions other than those of the institution that issued the cards.

All ATM machines, at a minimum, will permit cash withdrawals of customers of the machine's owner (if a bank-operated machine) and for cards that are affiliated with any ATM network the machine is also affiliated. They will report the amount of the withdrawal and any fees charged by the machine on the receipt. Most banks and credit unions will permit routine account-related banking transactions at the bank's own ATM, including deposits, checking the balance of an account, and transferring money between accounts. Some may provide additional services, such as selling postage stamps.

For other types of transactions through telephone or online banking, this may be performed with an ATM card without in-person authentication. This includes account balance inquiries, electronic bill payments, or in some cases, online purchases (see Interac Online).

ATM cards can also be used on improvised ATMs such as "mini ATMs", merchants' card terminals that deliver ATM features without any cash drawer. These terminals can also be used as cashless scrip ATMs by cashing the receipts they issue at the merchant's point of sale. In 2017, there were 20.48 billion payment cards in circulation worldwide In 2018, the payment card fraud losses in the world were US$27.85 billion, and US$9.47 billion in the U.S.

=== Stored-value card ===
With a stored-value card, a monetary value is stored on the card, and not in an externally recorded account. This differs from prepaid cards where money is on deposit with the issuer similar to a debit card. One major difference between stored value cards and prepaid debit cards is that prepaid debit cards are usually issued in the name of individual account holders, while stored-value cards are usually anonymous.

The term stored-value card means that the funds and or data are physically stored on the card. With prepaid cards the data is maintained on computers controlled by the card issuer. The value stored on the card can be accessed using a magnetic stripe embedded in the card, on which the card number is encoded; using radio-frequency identification (RFID); or by entering a code number, printed on the card, into a telephone or other numeric keypad.

=== Fleet card ===
A fleet card is used as a payment card, most commonly for gasoline, diesel and other fuels at gas stations. Fleet cards can also be used to pay for vehicle maintenance and expenses, at the discretion of the fleet owner or manager. The use of a fleet card reduces the need to carry cash, thus increasing the security for fleet drivers. The elimination of cash also helps to prevent fraudulent transactions at the fleet owner's or manager's expense.

Fleet cards provide convenient and comprehensive reporting, enabling fleet owners/managers to receive real time reports and set purchase controls with their cards, helping to keep them informed of all business related expenses. They may also reduce administrative work or otherwise be essential in arranging fuel taxation refunds.

=== Other ===
Other types of payment cards include:

- Gift card
- Digital currency
- Store card
- Visa card

== Technologies ==
A number of International Organization for Standardization standards, ISO/IEC 7810, ISO/IEC 7811, ISO/IEC 7812, ISO/IEC 7813, ISO 8583, and ISO/IEC 4909, define the physical properties of payment cards, including size, flexibility, location of the magstripe, magnetic characteristics, and data formats. They also provide the standards for financial cards, including the allocation of card number ranges to different card issuing institutions.

=== Embossing ===
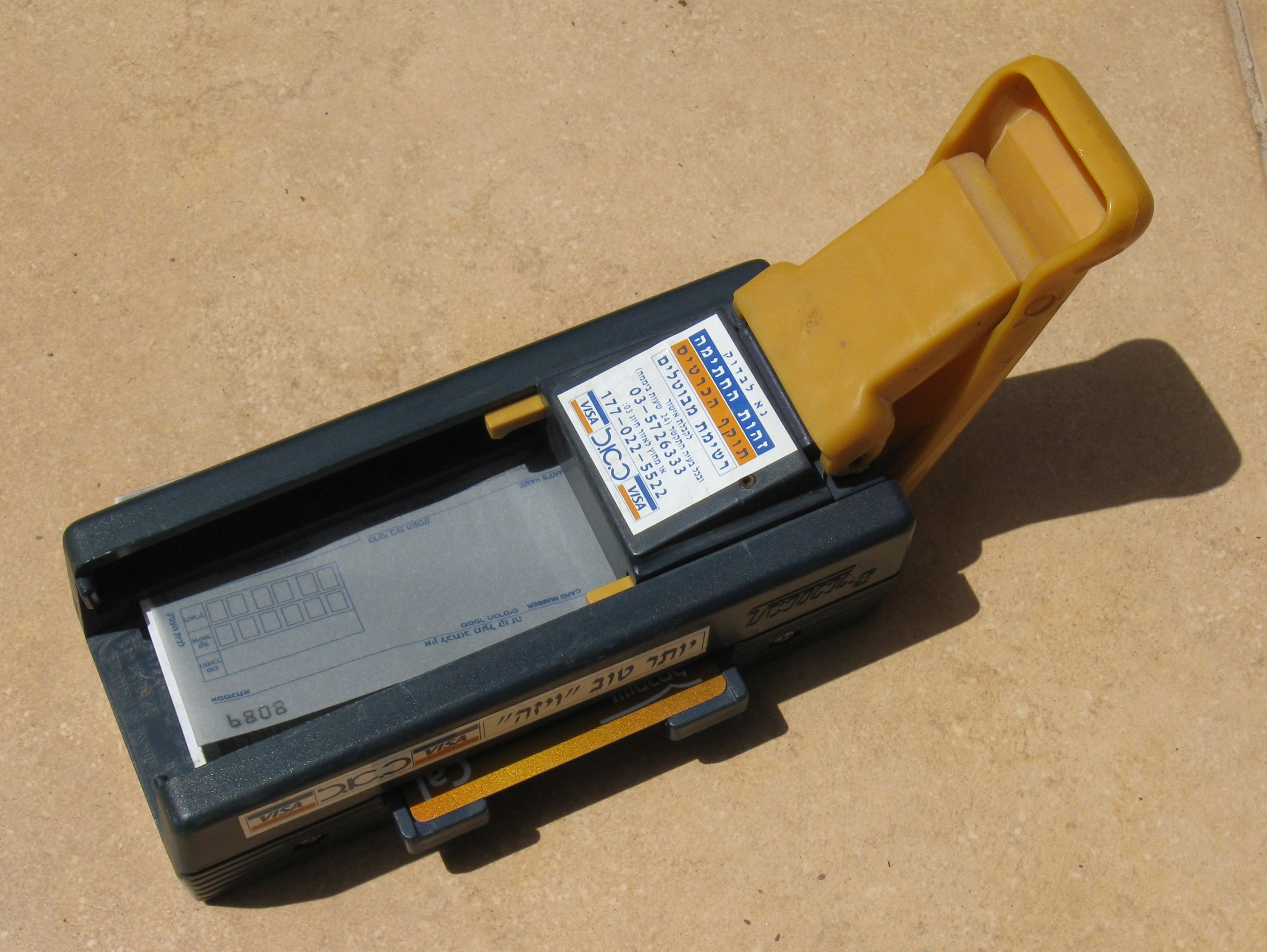
Israeli manual card imprinter

Originally charge account identification was paper-based. In 1959 American Express was the first charge card operator to issue embossed plastic cards which enabled cards to be manually imprinted for processing, making processing faster and reducing transcription errors. Other credit card issuers followed suit. The information typically embossed are the bank card number, card expiry date and cardholder's name. Though the imprinting method has been predominantly superseded by the magnetic stripe and then by the integrated chip, cards continued to be embossed in case a transaction needs to be processed manually until recently. Under manual processing, cardholder verification was by the cardholder signing the payment voucher after which the merchant would check the signature against the cardholder's signature on the back of the card. Cards conform to the ISO/IEC 7810 ID-1 standard, ISO/IEC 7811 on embossing, and the ISO/IEC 7812 card numbering standard.

=== Magnetic stripe ===
An example of the reverse side of a typical debit card: 1. Magnetic stripe; 2. Signature strip; 3. Card Security Code

Magnetic stripes started to be rolled out on debit cards in the 1970s with the introduction of ATMs. The magnetic stripe stores card data which can be read by physical contact and swiping past a reading head. The magnetic stripe contains all the information appearing on the card face, but allows for faster processing at point-of-sale than the then manual alternative as well as subsequently by the transaction processing company. When the magnetic stripe is being used, the cardholder will have been issued with a PIN, which is used for cardholder identification at the point-of-sale, and a signature is no longer required. The magnetic stripe is in the process of being augmented by the integrated chip.

=== Smart card ===
A smart card, chip card, or integrated circuit card (ICC) is any pocket-sized card with embedded integrated circuits which can process data. This implies that it can receive input which is processed – by way of the ICC applications – and delivered as an output. There are two broad categories of ICCs. Memory cards contain only non-volatile memory storage components, and perhaps some specific security logic. Microprocessor cards contain volatile memory and microprocessor components. The card is made of plastic, generally PVC, but sometimes ABS. The card may embed a hologram to avoid counterfeiting. Using smart cards is also a form of strong security authentication for single sign-on within large companies and organizations.

EMV is the standard adopted by all major issuers of smart payment cards.

=== Proximity card ===
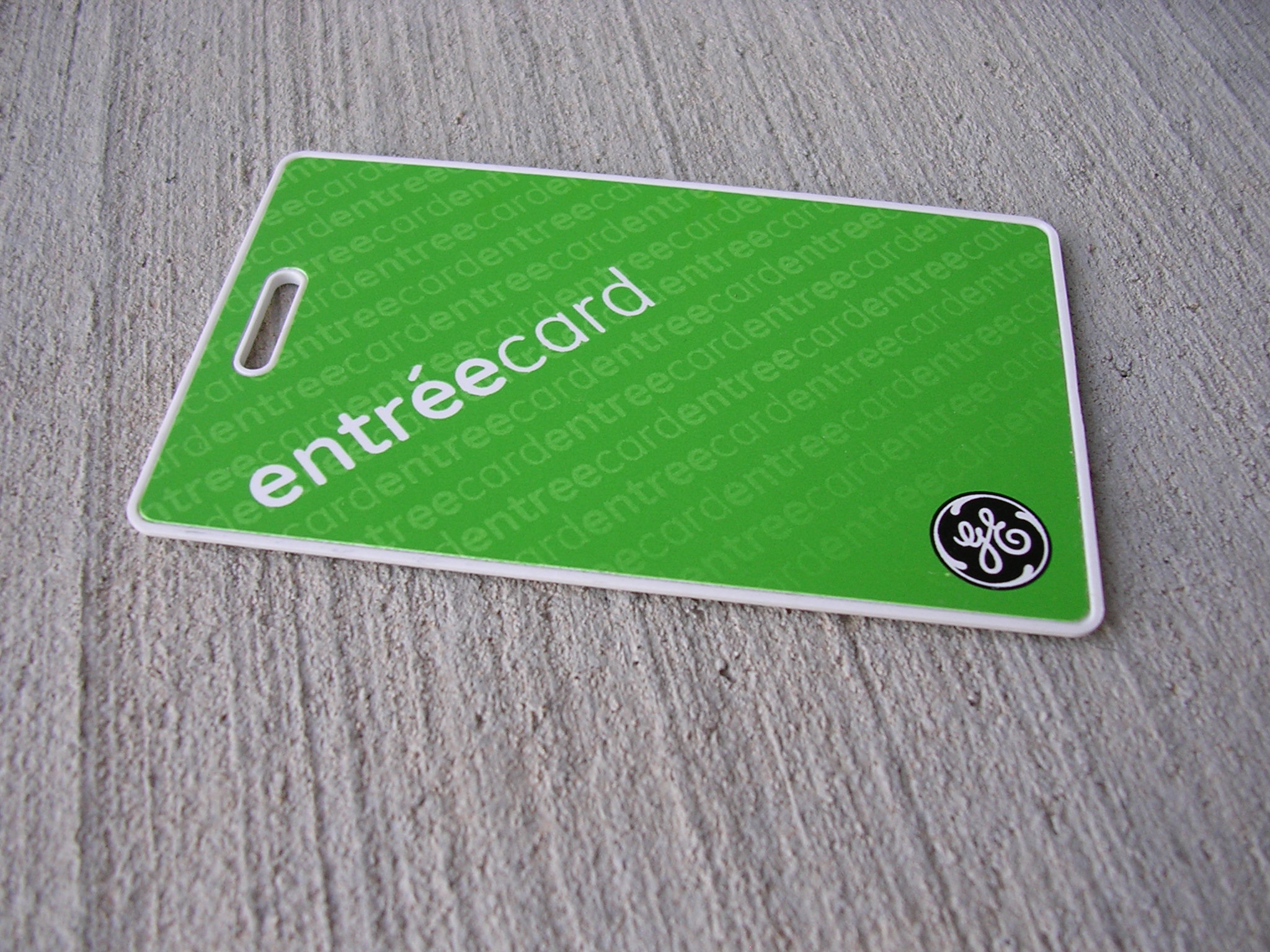
A proximity card

Proximity card (or prox card) is a generic name for contactless integrated circuit devices used for security access or payment systems. It can refer to the older 125 kHz devices or the newer 13.56 MHz contactless RFID cards, most commonly known as contactless smartcards.

Modern proximity cards are covered by the ISO/IEC 14443 (proximity card) standard. There is also a related ISO/IEC 15693 (vicinity card) standard. Proximity cards are powered by resonant energy transfer and have a range of 0–3 inches in most instances. The user will usually be able to leave the card inside a wallet or purse. The price of the cards is also low, usually US$2–$5, allowing them to be used in applications such as identification cards, keycards, payment cards and public transit fare cards.

=== Re-programmable magnetic stripe card ===
Re-programmable/dynamic magnetic stripe cards are standard sized transaction cards that include a battery, a processor, and a means (inductive coupling or otherwise) of sending a variable signal to a magnetic stripe reader. Re-programmable stripe cards are often more secure than standard magnetic stripe cards and can transmit information for multiple cardholder accounts.

== Misuse ==
Due to increased illegal copies of cards with a magnetic stripe, the European Payments Council established a Card Fraud Prevention Task Force in 2003 that spawned a commitment to migrate all ATMs and POS applications to use a chip-and-PIN solution until the end of 2010. The "SEPA for Cards" has completely removed the magnetic stripe requirement from the former Maestro debit cards.

== See also ==
- Card not present transaction
- Payment card industry
- Payment card number
- Payment gateway
- Payment system
- Payment Services Directive
- Payment terminal
- Payments as a service
- Credit card fraud
- Prepayment for service
