= ISO/IEC 7813 =

International standard for cash cards and credit cards

ISO/IEC 7813 is an international standard codified by the International Organization for Standardization and International Electrotechnical Commission that defines properties of financial transaction cards, such as ATM or credit cards.

== Scope ==
The standard defines:

- physical characteristics, such as size, shape, location of magnetic stripe, etc.
- magnetic track data structures

== Physical characteristics ==
ISO/IEC 7813 specifies the following physical characteristics of the card, mostly by reference to other standards:

Embossed characters
by reference to ISO/IEC 7811
Embossing of expiration date
the format (MM/YY or MM-YY)
Magnetic stripe
by reference to ISO/IEC 7811
Integrated circuit with contacts
by reference to ISO/IEC 7816-1
Integrated circuit without contacts
by reference to ISO/IEC 10536-1, ISO/IEC 14443-1, and ISO/IEC 15693-1

== Magnetic tracks ==
=== Track 1 ===
Track 1 can store up to 79 alphanumeric characters. ISO 7813 specifies the following structure for track 1 data:

- SS : Start sentinel "%"
- FC : Format code "B" (The format described here. Format "A" is reserved for proprietary use.)
- PAN : Payment card number 4400664987366029, up to 19 digits
- FS : Field separator "^"
- NM : Name, 2 to 26 characters (including separators, where appropriate, between surname, first name etc.)
- FS : Field separator "^"
- ED : Expiration data, 4 digits or "^"
- SC : Service code, 3 digits or "^"
- DD : Discretionary data, balance of characters
- ES : End sentinel "?"
- LRC : Longitudinal redundancy check, calculated according to ISO/IEC 7811-2

==== Examples ====
%B4815881002867896^YATES/EUGENE JOHN ^37829821000123456789?

%B4815881002861896^YATES/EUGENE L ^^^356858 00998000000?

=== Track 2 ===
Track 2 can store up to 40 numeric or special characters; it uses a lower density magnetic encoding than Track 1 but a more compact character encoding. ISO 7813 specifies the following structure for track 2 data:

- SS : Start sentinel ";"
- PAN : Primary Account Number, up to 19 digits, as defined in ISO/IEC 7812-1
- FS : Field separator "="
- ED : Expiration date, YYMM or "=" if not present
- SC : Service code, 3 digits or "=" if not present
- DD : Discretionary data, balance of available digits
- ES : End sentinel "?"
- LRC : Longitudinal redundancy check, calculated according to ISO/IEC 7811-2

=== Track 3 ===
Track 3 uses the same density as track 1 but has the same character encoding as track 2, allowing it to store 107 numeric characters. It is virtually unused by the major worldwide networks and often isn't present on payment cards.

A notable exception to this is Germany, where Track 3 content was used nationally as the primary source of authorization and clearing information for debit card processing prior to the adoption of the "SECCOS" ICC standards. Track 3 is standardized nationally to contain both the cardholder's bank account number and branch sort code (BLZ).

=== Programming ===
Parsing Track 1 and Track 2 can be done with Regular Expressions.

==== Track 1 ====
^%B([0-9]{1,19})\^([^\^]{2,26})\^([0-9]{4}|\^)([0-9]{3}|\^)([^\?]*)\?$

This Regex will capture all of the important fields into the following groups:

- Group 1: Payment card number (PAN)
- Group 2: Name (NM)
- Group 3: Expiration Date (ED)
- Group 4: Service Code (SC)
- Group 5: Discretionary data (DD)

==== Track 2 ====
^\;([0-9]{1,19})\=([0-9]{4}|\=)([0-9]{3}|\=)([^\?]*)\?$

- Group 1: Primary Account Number (PAN)
- =
- Group 2: Expiration date (ED) or =
- Group 3: Service code (SC) or =
- Group 4: Discretionary data (DD) or empty
