= ISO 8583 =

International standard for financial transaction card originated interchange messaging

ISO 8583 is an international standard for financial transaction card originated interchange messaging. It is the International Organization for Standardization standard for systems that exchange electronic transactions initiated by cardholders using payment cards.

ISO 8583 defines a message format and a communication flow so that different systems can exchange these transaction requests and responses. The vast majority of transactions made when a customer uses a card to make a payment in a store (EFTPOS) use ISO 8583 at some point in the communication chain, as do transactions made at ATMs. In particular, the Mastercard, Visa and Verve networks base their authorization communications on the ISO 8583 standard, as do many other institutions and networks.

Although ISO 8583 defines a common standard, it is not typically used directly by systems or networks. It defines many standard fields (data elements) which remain the same in all systems or networks, and leaves a few additional fields for passing network-specific details. These fields are used by each network to adapt the standard for its own use with custom fields and custom usages like Proximity Cards.

== Introduction ==
The ISO 8583 specification has three parts:

- Part 1: Messages, data elements, and code values
- Part 2: Application and registration procedures for Institution Identification Codes (IIC)
- Part 3: Maintenance procedures for the aforementioned messages, data elements and code values

== Message format ==
A card-based transaction typically travels from a transaction-acquiring device, such as a point-of-sale terminal (POS) or an automated teller machine (ATM), through a series of networks, to a card issuing system for authorization against the card holder's account. The transaction data contains information derived from the card (e.g., the card number or card holder details), the terminal (e.g., the terminal number, the merchant number), the transaction (e.g., the amount), together with other data which may be generated dynamically or added by intervening systems. Based on this information, the card issuing system will either authorize or decline the transaction and generate a response message which must be delivered back to the terminal within a predefined time period.

An ISO 8583 message is made of the following parts:

- Message type indicator (MTI)
- One or more bitmaps, indicating which data elements are present. It consists of primary bitmap and secondary bitmap. The first bit of the primary bitmap indicates whether the secondary bitmap is present or not.
- Data elements, the actual information fields of the message

The placements of fields in different versions of the standard varies; for example, the currency elements of the 1987 and 1993 versions of the standard are no longer used in the 2003 version, which holds currency as a sub-element of any financial amount element. As of June 2017, however ISO 8583:2003 has yet to achieve wide acceptance. ISO 8583 messaging has no routing information, so is sometimes used with a TPDU header.

Cardholder-originated transactions include purchase, withdrawal, deposit, refund, reversal, balance inquiry, payments and inter-account transfers. ISO 8583 also defines system-to-system messages for secure key exchanges, reconciliation of totals, and other administrative purposes.

=== Message type indicator ===
The message type indicator (MTI) is a four-digit numeric field which indicates the overall function of the message. A message type indicator includes the ISO 8583 version, the Message Class, the Message Function and the Message Origin, as described below.

==== ISO 8583 version ====
The first digit of the MTI indicates the ISO 8583 version in which the message is encoded.

Code	Meaning
0xxx	ISO 8583:1987
1xxx	ISO 8583:1993
2xxx	ISO 8583:2003
3xxx	Reserved by ISO
4xxx	Reserved by ISO
5xxx	Reserved by ISO
6xxx	Reserved by ISO
7xxx	Reserved by ISO
8xxx	National use
9xxx	Private use

==== Message class ====
Position two of the MTI specifies the overall purpose of the message.

Code	Meaning	Usage
x0xx	Reserved by ISO	
x1xx	Authorization message	Determine if funds are available, get an approval but do not post to account for reconciliation. Dual message system (DMS), awaits file exchange for posting to the account.
x2xx	Financial messages	Determine if funds are available, get an approval and post directly to the account. Single message system (SMS), no file exchange after this.
x3xx	File actions message	Used for hot-card, TMS and other exchanges
x4xx	Reversal and charge-back messages	Reversal (x4x0 or x4x1): Reverses the action of a previous authorization. Charge-back (x4x2 or x4x3): Charges back a previously cleared financial message.
x5xx	Reconciliation message	Transmits settlement information message.
x6xx	Administrative message	Transmits administrative advice. Often used for failure messages (e.g., message reject or failure to apply).
x7xx	Fee collection messages	
x8xx	Network management message	Used for secure key exchange, logon, echo test and other network functions.
x9xx	Reserved by ISO	

==== Message function ====
Position three of the MTI specifies the messages function which defines how the message should flow within the system. Requests are end-to-end messages (e.g., from acquirer to issuer and back with time-outs and automatic reversals in place), while advices are point-to-point messages (e.g., from terminal to acquirer, from acquirer to network, from network to issuer, with transmission guaranteed over each link, but not necessarily immediately).

Code	Meaning	Notes
xx0x	Request	Request from acquirer to issuer to carry out an action; issuer may accept or reject
xx1x	Request response	Response to a request
xx2x	Advice	Advice that an action has taken place; receiver can only accept, not reject
xx3x	Advice response	Response to an advice
xx4x	Notification	Notification that an event has taken place; receiver can only accept, not reject
xx5x	Notification acknowledgement	Response to a notification
xx6x	Instruction	ISO 8583:2003
xx7x	Instruction acknowledgement	ISO 8583:2003
xx8x	Reserved for ISO use	Some implementations (such as MasterCard) use for positive acknowledgment.
xx9x	Reserved for ISO use	Some implementations (such as MasterCard) use for negative acknowledgement.

==== Message origin ====
Position four of the MTI defines the location of the message source within the payment chain.

Code	Meaning
xxx0	Acquirer
xxx1	Acquirer repeat
xxx2	Issuer
xxx3	Issuer repeat
xxx4	Other
xxx5	Other repeat
xxx6	Reserved by ISO
xxx7	Reserved by ISO
xxx8	Reserved by ISO
xxx9	Reserved by ISO

==== Examples ====
Given an MTI value of 0110, the following example lists what each position indicates:

- 0xxx → version of ISO 8583 (0 = 1987 version)
- x1xx → class of the message (1 = authorization message)
- xx1x → function of the message (1 = response)
- xxx0 → who began the communication (0 = acquirer)

Therefore, MTI 0110 is an authorization response message where actual transaction was originated by the acquirer.

Bearing each of the above four positions in mind, an MTI will completely specify what a message should do, and how it is to be transmitted around the network. Unfortunately, not all ISO 8583 implementations interpret the meaning of an MTI in the same way. However, a few MTIs are relatively standard:

MTI	Meaning	Usage
0100	Authorization Request	Request from a point-of-sale terminal for authorization for a cardholder purchase
0110	Authorization Response	Request response to a point-of-sale terminal for authorization for a cardholder purchase
0120	Authorization Advice	When the point-of-sale device breaks down and you have to sign a voucher
0121	Authorization Advice Repeat	If the advice times out
0130	Acquirer Response to Authorization Advice	Confirmation of receipt of authorization advice
0200	Acquirer Financial Request	Request for funds, typically from an ATM or pinned point-of-sale device
0210	Acquirer Response to Financial Request	Issuer response to request for funds
0220	Acquirer Financial Advice	e.g. Checkout at a hotel. Used to complete transaction initiated with authorization request
0221	Acquirer Financial Advice Repeat	If the advice times out
0230	Acquirer Response to Financial Advice	Confirmation of receipt of financial advice
0320	Batch Upload	File update/transfer advice
0330	Batch Upload Response	File update/transfer advice response
0400	Acquirer Reversal Request	Reverses a transaction
0420	Acquirer Reversal Advice	
0430	Acquirer Reversal Advice Response	
0510	Batch Settlement Response	Card acceptor reconciliation request response
0800	Network Management Request	Hypercom terminals initialize request. Echo test, logon, logoff etc.
0810	Network Management Response	Hypercom terminals initialize response. Echo test, logon, logoff etc.
0820	Network Management Advice	Key change

=== Bitmaps ===
In ISO 8583, a bitmap is a field or subfield within a message, which indicates whether other data elements or data element subfields are present elsewhere in the message.

A field is considered to be present only when the corresponding bit in the bitmap is set. For example, a hex with value 0x82 (decimal 130) is binary 1000 0010, which means fields 1 and 7 are present in the message and fields 2, 3, 4, 5, 6 and 8 are not.

The bitmap may be represented as 8 bytes of binary data or as 16 hexadecimal characters (0–9, A–F) in the ASCII or EBCDIC character sets. A message will contain at least one bitmap, called the primary bitmap, which indicates data whether elements 1 to 64 are present. The presence of an optional secondary bitmap is also indicated by the first bit in the primary bitmap. If present, the secondary bitmap indicates whether data elements 65 to 128 are present. Similarly, a tertiary bitmap can be used to indicate the presence of fields 129 to 192, although these data elements are rarely used.

==== Examples ====
Given a bitmap value of 70 10 00 11 02 C0 48 04,

0x70 = 0111 0000 (counting from the left, the second, third and fourth bits are 1, indicating that fields 2, 3 and 4 are present)
0x10 = 0001 0000 (the first bit corresponds to field 9, so the fourth bit here indicates field 12 is present)
0x00 = 0000 0000 (no fields present)
0x11 = 0001 0001 (fields 28 and 32 are present)
0x02 = 0000 0010 (field 39 is present)
0xC0 = 1100 0000 (fields 41 and 42 are present)
0x48 = 0100 1000 (fields 50 and 53 are present)
0x04 = 0000 0100 (field 62 is present)

n^{th} bit	0	10	20	30	40	50	60
n^{th} bit	1234567890	1234567890	1234567890	1234567890	1234567890	1234567890	1234
Bitmap	0111000000	0100000000	0000000100	0100000010	1100000001	0010000000	0100

Therefore, the given bitmap defines the following fields present in the message::
2, 3, 4, 12, 28, 32, 39, 41, 42, 50, 53, 62 .

=== Data elements ===
Data elements are the individual fields carrying the transaction information. There are up to 128 data elements specified in the original ISO 8583:1987 standard, and up to 192 data elements in later releases. The 1993 revision added new definitions, deleted some, while leaving the message format itself unchanged.

While each data element has a specified meaning and format, the standard also includes some general purpose data elements and system- or country-specific data elements which vary enormously in use and form from implementation to implementation.

Each data element is described in a standard format which defines the permitted content of the field (numeric, binary, etc.) and the field length (variable or fixed), according to the following table:

Abbreviation	Meaning
a	Alpha, including blanks
n	Numeric values only
x+n	Numeric (amount) values, where the first byte is either 'C' to indicate a positive or Credit value, or 'D' to indicate a negative or Debit value, followed by the numeric value (using n digits)
s	Special characters only
an	Alphanumeric
as	Alpha & special characters only
ns	Numeric and special characters only
ans	Alphabetic, numeric and special characters.
anp	Alphabetic, numeric and pad characters.
b	Binary data
p	Pad character, space
z	Tracks 2 and 3 code set as defined in ISO/IEC 7813 and ISO/IEC 4909 respectively
. or .. or ...	variable field length indicator, each . indicating a digit.
x or xx or xxx	fixed length of field, or maximum length in the case of variable length fields.

Additionally, each field may be either fixed or variable length. If variable, the length of the field will be preceded by a length indicator.

Type	Meaning
Fixed	no field length used
LLVAR or (..xx)	Where 0 < LL < 100, means two leading digits LL specify the field length of field VAR
LLLVAR or (...xxx)	Where 0 < LLL < 1000, means three leading digits LLL specify the field length of field VAR
LL and LLL are hex or ASCII. A VAR field can be compressed or ASCII depending on the data element type.	LL can be one or two bytes. For example, if compressed as one hex byte, '27x means there are 27 VAR bytes to follow. If ASCII, the two bytes '32x, '37x mean there are 27 bytes to follow. Three-digit field length LLL uses two bytes with a leading '0' nibble if compressed, or three bytes if ASCII. The format of a VAR data element depends on the data element type. If numeric it will be compressed, e.g. 87456 will be represented by three hex bytes '087456x. If ASCII then one byte for each digit or character is used, e.g. '38x, '37x, '34x, '35x, '36x.

==== Examples ====
Field Definition	Meaning
n 6	Fixed length field of six digits
n.6	LVAR numeric field of up to 6 digits in length
a..11	LLVAR alpha field of up to 11 characters in length
b...999	LLLVAR binary field of up to 999 bytes in length

==== ISO-defined data elements (ver 1987) ====
Data field	Type	Usage
1	b 16 (16 Digit Hex value which is read as Binary of 64 bits. If Secondary Bitmap is present then it is 32 Digit Hex value which is read as a Binary of 128 bits)	Bitmap
2	n..19	Primary account number (PAN)
3	n 6	Processing Code
4	n 12	Amount Transaction
5	n 12	Amount, settlement
6	n 12	Amount, cardholder billing
7	n 10	Transmission date & time
8	n 8	Amount, cardholder billing fee
9	n 8	Conversion rate, settlement
10	n 8	Conversion rate, cardholder billing
11	n 6	System trace audit number (STAN)
12	n 6	Local transaction time (hhmmss)
13	n 4	Local transaction date (MMDD)
14	n 4	Expiration date (YYMM)
15	n 4	Settlement date
16	n 4	Currency conversion date
17	n 4	Capture date
18	n 4	Merchant type, or merchant category code
19	n 3	Acquiring institution (country code)
20	n 3	PAN extended (country code)
21	n 3	Forwarding institution (country code)
22	n 3	Point of service entry mode
23	n 3	Application PAN sequence number
24	n 3	Function code (ISO 8583:1993), or network international identifier (NII)
25	n 2	Point of service condition code
26	n 2	Point of service capture code
27	n 1	Authorizing identification response length
28	x+n 8	Amount, transaction fee
29	x+n 8	Amount, settlement fee
30	x+n 8	Amount, transaction processing fee
31	x+n 8	Amount, settlement processing fee
32	n ..11	Acquiring institution identification code
33	n ..11	Forwarding institution identification code
34	ns ..28	Primary account number, extended
35	z ..37	Track 2 data
36	n ...104	Track 3 data
37	an 12	Retrieval reference number
38	an 6	Authorization identification response
39	an 2	Response code
40	an 3	Service restriction code
41	ans 8	Card acceptor terminal identification
42	ans 15	Card acceptor identification code. Example: DE42 = "INDBANK00012345".
43	ans 40	Card acceptor name/location (1–25 card acceptor name or automated teller machine (ATM) location, 26-38 city name, 39-40 country code). Example: DE43 = "HP PETROL BUNK     BANGALORE   KA IN".
44	an ..25	Additional response data
45	an ..76	Track 1 data
46	an ...999	Additional data (ISO)
47	an ...999	Additional data (national)
48	an ...999	Additional data (private)
49	a or n 3	Currency code, transaction
50	a or n 3	Currency code, settlement
51	a or n 3	Currency code, cardholder billing
52	b 64	Personal identification number data
53	n 16	Security related control information
54	an ...120	Additional amounts
55	ans ...999	ICC data – EMV having multiple tags
56	ans ...999	Reserved (ISO)
57	ans ...999	Reserved (national)
58	ans ...999	Reserved (national)
59	ans ...999	Reserved (national)
60	ans ...999	Reserved (national) (e.g. settlement request: batch number, advice transactions: original transaction amount, batch upload: original MTI plus original RRN plus original STAN, etc.)
61	ans ...999	Reserved (private) (e.g. CVV2/service code transactions)
62	ans ...999	Reserved (private) (e.g. transactions: invoice number, key exchange transactions: TPK key, etc.)
63	ans ...999	Reserved (private)
64	b 64	Message authentication code (MAC)
65	b 1	Extended bitmap indicator
66	n 1	Settlement code
67	n 2	Extended payment code
68	n 3	Receiving institution country code
69	n 3	Settlement institution country code
70	n 3	Network management information code
71	n 4	Message number
72	n 4	Last message's number
73	n 6	Action date (YYMMDD)
74	n 10	Number of credits
75	n 10	Credits, reversal number
76	n 10	Number of debits
77	n 10	Debits, reversal number
78	n 10	Transfer number
79	n 10	Transfer, reversal number
80	n 10	Number of inquiries
81	n 10	Number of authorizations
82	n 12	Credits, processing fee amount
83	n 12	Credits, transaction fee amount
84	n 12	Debits, processing fee amount
85	n 12	Debits, transaction fee amount
86	n 16	Total amount of credits
87	n 16	Credits, reversal amount
88	n 16	Total amount of debits
89	n 16	Debits, reversal amount
90	n 42	Original data elements Original MTI (4 digits)   Original STAN (DE11) (6 digits)   Original Transmission Date & Time (DE7) (10 digits)   Original Acquiring Institution ID Code (DE32) (11 digits)   Original Forwarding Institution ID Code (DE33) (11 digits)
91	an 1	File update code
92	an 2	File security code
93	an 5	Response indicator
94	an 7	Service indicator
95	an 42	Replacement amounts
96	b 64	Message security code
97	x+n 16	Net settlement amount
98	ans 25	Payee
99	n ..11	Settlement institution identification code
100	n ..11	Receiving institution identification code
101	ans ..17	File name
102	ans ..28	Account identification 1
103	ans ..28	Account identification 2
104	ans ...100	Transaction description
105	ans ...999	Reserved for ISO use
106	ans ...999	Reserved for ISO use
107	ans ...999	Reserved for ISO use
108	ans ...999	Reserved for ISO use
109	ans ...999	Reserved for ISO use
110	ans ...999	Reserved for ISO use
111	ans ...999	Reserved for ISO use
112	ans ...999	Reserved for national use
113	ans ...999	Reserved for national use
114	ans ...999	Reserved for national use
115	ans ...999	Reserved for national use
116	ans ...999	Reserved for national use
117	ans ...999	Reserved for national use
118	ans ...999	Reserved for national use
119	ans ...999	Reserved for national use
120	ans ...999	Reserved for private use
121	ans ...999	Reserved for private use
122	ans ...999	Reserved for private use
123	ans ...999	Reserved for private use
124	ans ...999	Reserved for private use
125	ans ...999	Reserved for private use
126	ans ...999	Reserved for private use
127	ans ...999	Reserved for private use
128	b 64	Message authentication code

==== Processing code ====
The following is a table specifying the type of messages and processing code for each transaction type.

Transaction	Message type	Processing code
Authorization	0100	00 a0 0x
Balance inquiry	0100	31 a0 0x
Sale	0200	00 a0 0x
Cash	0200	01 a0 0x
Sale Refund	0200	20 a0 0x
Void	0200	02 a0 0x
Mobile topup		57 a0 0x
Credit Voucher		26

==== Response code ====
===== Ver 1987 =====
The following table shows response codes and their meanings for ISO 8583-1987, later versions uses 3 and 4 digit response codes.

Code	Description
00	Approved or completed successfully
01	Refer to card issuer
02	Refer to card issuer's special conditions
03	Invalid merchant
04	Pick-up
05	Do not honor
06	Error
07	Pick-up card, special condition
08	Honour with identification
09	Request in progress
10	Approved for partial amount
11	Approved (VIP)
12	Invalid transaction
13	Invalid amount
14	Invalid card number (no such number)
15	No such issuer
16	Approved, update track 3
17	Customer cancellation
18	Customer dispute
19	Re-enter transaction
20	Invalid response
21	No action taken
22	Suspected malfunction
23	Unacceptable transaction fee
24	File update not supported by receiver
25	Unable to locate record on file
26	Duplicate file update record, old record replaced
27	File update field edit error
28	File update file locked out
29	File update not successful, contact acquirer
30	Format error
31	Bank not supported by switch
32	Completed partially
33	Expired card
34	Suspected fraud
35	Card acceptor contact acquirer
36	Restricted card
37	Card acceptor call acquirer security
38	Allowable PIN tries exceeded
39	No credit account
40	Requested function not supported
41	Lost card
42	No universal account
43	Stolen card, pick-up
44	No investment account
45-50	Reserved for ISO use
51	Not sufficient funds
52	No checking account
53	No savings account
54	Expired card
55	Incorrect personal identification number
56	No card record
57	Transaction not permitted to cardholder
58	Transaction not permitted to terminal
59	Suspected fraud
60	Card acceptor contact acquirer
61	Exceeds withdrawal amount limit
62	Restricted card
63	Security violation
64	Original amount incorrect
65	Exceeds withdrawal frequency limit
66	Card acceptor call acquirer's security department
67	Hard capture (requires that card be picked up at ATM)
68	Response received too late
69-74	Reserved for ISO use
75	Allowable number of PIN tries exceeded
78	Card not activated
80	Visa transactions: credit issuer unavailable
82	Invalid card expiration date
82	CVN Mismatch: Negative CAM, dCVV, iCVV, or CVV results
85	Success: address verification
76-89	Reserved for private use
90	Cutoff is in process (switch ending a day's business and starting the next. Transaction can be sent again in a few minutes)
91	Issuer or switch is inoperative
92	Financial institution or intermediate network facility cannot be found for routing
93	Transaction cannot be completed. Violation of law
94	Duplicate transmission
95	Reconcile error
96	System malfunction
97-99	Reserved for national use
Zero A-9Z	Reserved for ISO use
A Zero-MZ	Reserved for national use
N Zero-ZZ	Reserved for private use

===== Ver 1993 =====
Code	Description
000‑099	Used in 1110, 1120, 1121, 1140 and 1210, 1220, 1221 and 1240 messages to indicate that the transaction has been approved.
000	approved
001	honour with identification
002	approved for partial amount
003	approved (VIP)
004	approved, update track 3
005	approved, account type specified by card issuer
006	approved for partial amount, account type specified by card issuer
007	approved, update ICC
008‑059	reserved for ISO use
060‑079	reserved for national use
080‑099	reserved for private use
100‑199	Used in 1110, 1120, 1121, 1140 and 1210, 1220, 1221 and 1240 messages to indicate that the transaction has been processed for authorization by or on behalf of the card issuer and has been denied (not requiring a card pick-up)
100	do not honor
101	expired card
102	suspected fraud
103	card acceptor contact acquirer
104	restricted card
105	card acceptor call acquirer's security department
106	allowable PIN tries exceeded
107	refer to card issuer
108	refer to card issuer's special conditions
109	invalid merchant
110	invalid amount
111	invalid card number
112	PIN data required
113	unacceptable fee
114	no account of type requested
115	requested function not supported
116	not sufficient funds
117	incorrect PIN
118	no card record
119	transaction not permitted to cardholder
120	transaction not permitted to terminal
121	exceeds withdrawal amount limit
122	security violation
123	exceeds withdrawal frequency limit
124	violation of law
125	card not effective
126	invalid PIN block
127	PIN length error
128	PIN key sync error
129	suspected counterfeit card
130‑159	reserved for ISO use
160‑179	reserved for national use
180‑199	reserved for private use
200‑299	Used in 1110, 1120, 1121, 1140 and 1210, 1220, 1221 and 1240 messages to indicate that the transaction has been processed for authorization by or on behalf of the card issuer and has been denied requiring the card to be picked up.
200	do not honour
201	expired card
202	suspected fraud
203	card acceptor contact acquirer
204	restricted card
205	card acceptor call acquirer's security department
206	allowable PIN tries exceeded
207	special conditions
208	lost card
209	stolen card
210	suspected counterfeit card
211‑259	reserved for ISO use
260‑279	reserved for national use
280‑299	reserved for private use
300‑399	Used in 1314, 1324, 1325 and 1344 messages to indicate the result of the file action.
300	successful
301	not supported by receiver
302	unable to locate record on file
303	duplicate record, old record replaced
304	field edit error
305	file locked out
306	not successful
307	format error
308	duplicate, new record rejected
309	unknown file
310‑359	reserved for ISO use
360‑379	reserved for national use
380‑399	reserved for private use
400‑499	Used in 1430, 1432, 1440 and 1442 messages to indicate the result of the reversal or chargeback.
400	accepted
401‑459	reserved for ISO use
460‑479	reserved for national use
480‑499	reserved for private use
500‑599	Used in 1510, 1512, 1530 and 1532 messages to indicate the result of a reconciliation.
500	reconciled, in balance
501	reconciled, out of balance
502	amount not reconciled, totals provided
503	totals not available
504	not reconciled, totals provided
505‑559	reserved for ISO use
560‑579	reserved for national use
580‑599	reserved for private use
600‑699	Used in 1614, 1624, 1625, and 1644 messages
600	accepted
601	not able to trace back original transaction
602	invalid reference number
603	reference number/PAN incompatible
604	POS photograph is not available
605	item supplied
606	request cannot be fulfilled - required/requested documentation is not available
607‑659	reserved for ISO use
660‑679	reserved for national use
680‑699	reserved for private use
700‑799	Used in 1720, 1721, 1740, 1722, 1723 and 1742 messages.
700	accepted
701‑749	reserved for ISO use
750‑769	reserved for national use
770‑799	reserved for private use
800‑899	Used in 1814, 1824, 1825 and 1844 messages.
800	accepted
801‑859	reserved for ISO use
860‑879	reserved for national use
880‑899	reserved for private use
900	Advice acknowledged, no financial liability accepted
901	Advice acknowledged, financial liability accepted
902‑949	Used in request response and advice response messages to indicate transaction could not be processed.
902	invalid transaction
903	re-enter transaction
904	format error
905	acquirer not supported by switch
906	cutover in process
907	card issuer or switch inoperative
908	transaction destination cannot be found for routing
909	system malfunction
910	card issuer signed off
911	card issuer timed out
912	card issuer unavailable
913	duplicate transmission
914	not able to trace back to original transaction
915	reconciliation cutover or checkpoint error
916	MAC incorrect
917	MAC key sync error
918	No communication keys available for use
919	encryption key sync error
920	security software/hardware error - try again
921	security software/hardware error - no action
922	message number out of sequence
923	request in progress
924‑929	reserved for ISO use
930‑939	reserved for national use
940‑949	reserved for private use
950‑999	Used in advice response messages (1x3x) to indicate the reason for rejection of the transfer of financial liability.
950	violation of business arrangement
951‑983	reserved for ISO use
984‑991	reserved for national use
992‑999	reserved for private use

==== Point of service entry modes (Field 22) ====
The point of service (POS) mode field state what conditions the card has been read under, which type of authentication has been made, and depending on the version of the specification, what the capabilities of the terminal are.

===== Ver 2003 =====
For the 2003 specification the POS code consists of 16 binary characters split into four parts:

1. Card reading method used
2. Cardholder verification method used
3. POS environment
4. Security characteristics

===== Ver 1993 =====
For the 1993 version it is a 12-character field consisting of 5 parts:

1. The terminal input capabilities (1st to 3rd character)
  - Card Data Input Capability
  - Cardholder Authentication Capability
  - Card capture capability
2. The operating environment (4th to 6th character)
  - Operating Environment / Terminal placement
  - Cardholder Present indicator
  - Card Present indicator
3. Authentication and verification done (7th to 9th character)
  - Card Data Input Method
  - Cardholder Verification Method
  - Cardholder Authentication Entity
4. The terminal's output capabilities (10th and 11th character)
  - Card data output capability - can the terminal write to the magnetic stripe, or to the chip
  - Terminal output capability - can the terminal display or print something to the cardholder.
5. PIN capture capability (12th character) indicates if the terminal can capture a pin code, and if so, the maximum length it can capture.

===== Ver 1987 =====
The point of service entry mode value consists of two parts:

1. PAN entry mode, the first two digits
2. PIN entry capability, the third digit

The following table shows PAN entry modes and their meanings.

PAN Entry Mode	Meaning
00	Unknown
01	Manual
02	Magnetic stripe
03	Bar code
04	OCR
05	Integrated circuit card (ICC). CVV can be checked.
07	Auto entry via contactless EMV.
10	Merchant has Cardholder Credentials on File.
80	Fallback from integrated circuit card (ICC) to magnetic stripe
90	Magnetic stripe as read from track 2. CVV can be checked.
91	Auto entry via contactless magnetic stripe
95	Integrated circuit card (ICC). CVV may not be checked.
99	Same as original transaction.

The following table shows PIN entry capabilities and their meanings.

PIN Entry Capability	Meaning
0	Unknown
1	Terminal can accept PINs
2	Terminal cannot accept PINs
3	mPOS software-based PIN-entry capability
8	Terminal has PIN-entry capability but the PIN pad is not currently operative

== Related standards ==
The Australian standard AS 2805 incorporates ISO 8583 and also covers a large number of other payments topics.

== See also ==
- Magnetic stripe card
- NCR Corporation
- Itautec
- Diebold
- ISO 20022

== Tools ==
A simple and free ISO8583 Editor
