= Private label debit =

Internal transaction process

Private label debit refers to a merchant-branded card or mobile payment app that utilizes an automated clearing house (ACH) to directly debit consumer checking accounts. Used in a closed-loop environment, private label debit offers secure transactions through PIN protection or tokenization.

== Overview ==
Private label debit programs have become increasingly popular in the United States, totaling roughly $13 billion in payment value. Such programs are offered by well-known brands, including Target, Kroger, and Circle K, as a consumer loyalty strategy.

Companies such as ZipLine, First Data, and BIM Networks implement private label debit programs for such brands.
