= PAN truncation =

Anti-fraud measure for payment card

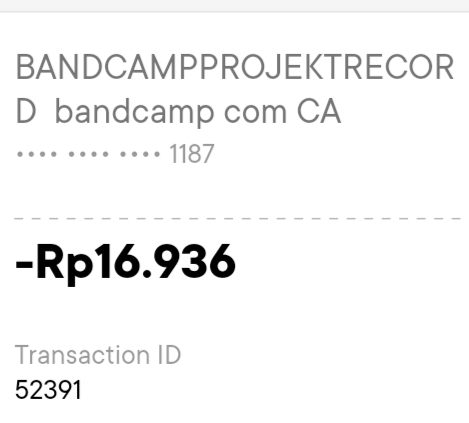
Example of PAN truncation on a banking mobile application for an album bought at Bandcamp

PAN truncation is an anti-fraud measure available on some credit-card-processing point of sale (POS) terminals as part of a merchant account service.

"PAN" is an acronym for primary account number, i.e., the "card number" on either a debit or a credit card. PAN truncation simply replaces the card number printed on a customer receipt with a printout of only the last four digits, the remainder being replaced usually by asterisks. This hides the card number from anyone who obtains the receipt when discarded, or by other means, while still allowing a card holder with multiple cards to identify which was used, and thus accurately record the transaction.

PAN truncation is a measure to combat payment card fraud, which is increasing worldwide, particularly in a global market where "card not present" (CNP) transactions are increasingly popular over the Internet, by mail, and by telephone.

== See also ==
- Tokenization (data security)
