= Conga Corporation =

American software company

- Trade name: Conga
- Formerly: Apttus
- Type: Privately held company
- Industry: Enterprise software
- Predecessor: AppExtremes
- Founded: 2006; 20 years ago
- Founder: Neehar Giri, Kent Perkocha, Kirk Krappe
- Headquarters: Broomfield, Colorado, United States
- Services: Revenue management, contract management, ecommerce management
- Owner: Thoma Bravo

Conga is an American business-to-business software provider specializing in business process automation and Contract Lifecycle Management (CLM) tools.

The company provides what it calls “middle office” solutions, utilizing artificial intelligence to optimize various financial and commercial functions, such as quote-to-cash, revenue management, and e-commerce management. Apttus’ software was originally developed to leverage the Salesforce customer relationship management platform, but it has since been integrated with Microsoft Azure and IBM Cloud as well.

In May 2020, Apttus merged with contract lifecycle management (CLM) specialist Conga and took the name Conga.

== History ==
Apttus (the former name of Conga) was founded in 2006 by Kirk Krappe, Neehar Giri, and Kent Perkocha. The three co-founders reportedly developed the company from ideas written down on napkins in a laundry room. Krappe served as the company's first CEO, with Giri as Chief Solutions Officer and Perkocha as Chief Customer Officer.

The company was bootstrapped and took no outside funding until 2013, when it raised $37 million in Series A financing from a group of investors including K1 Capital, ICONIQ, and Salesforce. By the time of its 2018 buyout, Apttus had received a total of $404 million in investment capital from five rounds of fundraising, which gave the company a valuation of approximately $1.3 billion, as of September 2016.

Despite publicly discussing the likelihood of an initial public offering in 2016, the company never went public before being acquired by Thoma Bravo. The 2015 acquisition of Apttus rival SteelBrick by Salesforce, an early Apttus investor, was widely blamed for Apttus’ inability to complete an IPO or find a buyer at more favorable terms. Thoma Bravo took a majority stake in Apttus in September 2018. The cost of the purchase was not revealed.

In September 2018, private equity firm Thoma Bravo purchased a majority stake in Apttus. This resulted in significant turnover in the executive ranks, as Thoma Bravo installed a new CEO, CFO, Chief Legal Officer, Chief People Officer, Vice President of Finance, and Corporate Controller by the end of 2018. Krappe departed Apttus with little warning, a move later reported to have been driven by accusations of sexual assault and misrepresentations of the company's financial performance. The allegations, which became public on November 1, 2018 with the publication of a Business Insider investigative piece, highlighted a company sales retreat at the One&Only Palmilla resort near Cabo San Lucas in Mexico, during which Krappe reportedly sexually assaulted a 26-year-old female business development employee. Other allegations accused Krappe of presenting misleading data on Apttus’ size and financial health, and at the time of the report, there were “several” sexual harassment claims underway, as well as three lawsuits over the financial misrepresentation issues.

In May 2020, Apttus acquired AppExtremes, Inc., doing business as Conga, and adopted its trade name for itself. The deal was valued at $715 million USD.

In August 2021, Conga acquired Contract Wrangler.
