= AppExtremes =

AppExtremes, Inc
- Trade name: Conga
- Type: Private
- Industry: Software
- Founded: 2006
- Defunct: 2020
- Fate: Acquired by Apttus
- Successor: Conga Corporation
- Headquarters: Broomfield, Colorado
- Products: Conga Composer, Conga Grid, Conga Contracts, Conga Contracts for Salesforce, Conga Sign, Conga Collaborate, Conga Orchestrate, Conga AI

AppExtremes, Inc., later doing business as Conga, was an American software company founded in 2006, provides document generation, presentation, and reporting tools for Salesforce.com. Its first product, Conga Composer, was launched as the Salesforce.com Apex Day in January, 2007. Conga Composer allows automated creation of Microsoft Word documents from multiple Salesforce.com data sources. Based on customer feedback, support was added for HTML email, as well as multiple document types including: Microsoft Excel, Adobe PDF, and Microsoft PowerPoint.

AppExtremes officially re-branded itself to Conga on April 16, 2013.

AppExtremes has offices in Broomfield, Colorado and Hammersmith, England, and Melbourne, Australia.

The company claims thousands of Salesforce.com customers in more than 35 countries as of April 2012.

AppExtremes was acquired by Apttus in May 2020 for $715 million. Apttus adopted the Conga brand for itself and formally reincorporated itself as Conga Corporation in the process of acquiring AppExtremes.

== Partnerships ==
In April 2012, Conga Composer was added to the Dell Business Cloud Application portfolio.

In May 2012, AppExtremes became a founding member of the DocuSign Cloud partner program started "to bring together leaders in cloud computing who are standardizing on DocuSign for eSignature to make it easier, faster, and more secure for companies of all sizes to manage online transactions and signatures in the cloud."

== Funding ==
AppExtremes is privately funded.

In 2015, Insight Venture Partners invested $70 million in AppExtremes.
