= ISO/IEC 7811 =

ISO standard

ISO/IEC 7811 Identification cards — Recording technique is a set of nine (7811-1 to 7811-9) standards describing the recording technique on identification cards.

It comprises:

- "Part 1": Embossing
- "Part 2": Magnetic stripe — Low coercivity
- "Part 3": Location of embossed characters on ID-1 cards
  Part 3 is already withdrawn and revised by Part 1.
- "Part 4": Location of read-only magnetic tracks — Tracks 1 and 2
  Part 4 is already withdrawn and revised by Part 2.
- "Part 5": Location of read-write magnetic track — Track 3
  Part 5 is already withdrawn and revised by Part 2.
- "Part 6": Magnetic stripe — High coercivity
- "Part 7": Magnetic stripe — High coercivity, high density
  Allows capacity 10 times that of a card conforming to Part 6.
- "Part 8": Magnetic stripe -- Coercivity of 51,7 kA/m (650 Oe)
  (including any protective overlay)
- "Part 9": Tactile identifier mark
  Specifies the physical characteristics of a tactile identifier mark used by visually impaired card holders to distinguish their cards.
