= Payment card industry =

Industry managing card-based payment systems

The payment card industry (PCI) denotes the payment systems used for debit, credit, prepaid, e-purse, ATM, and POS cards and associated businesses.

== Overview ==
The payment card industry consists of all the organizations involved in payment systems. They store, process and transmit cardholder data, most notably for debit cards and credit cards. The security standards are developed by the Payment Card Industry Security Standards Council which develops the Payment Card Industry Data Security Standards used throughout the industry. Individual card brands establish compliance requirements that are used by service providers and have their own compliance programs. Major card brands include American Express, Diners Club International, Discover Card, JCB, Mastercard, Mir, RuPay, UnionPay and Visa. Most companies use member banks that connect and accept transactions from the card brands. Not all card brands use member banks, like American Express, these instead act as their own bank.

EMV is a global standard for inter-operation of smart cards (IC cards or "chip cards") and IC card capable point of sale (POS) terminals and automated teller machines (ATMs), for authenticating credit and debit card transactions. It has enhanced security features, but is still susceptible to fraud.

=== In Russia ===
The Russian credit card market started in early 2000, when issuers first began launching products. However, credit products became especially popular in Russia in 2005, after new legislation took effect. Immense growth was noted in just eight years, by comparing second quarter growth on Visa card purchases, which went from $306 million in 2002 to $61.5 billion in 2010. Merchants who accepted Visa cards also increased from 21,000 to 331,000 during the same period. Visa also noted that they had issued 70 million cards and the Central Bank of the Russian Federation reported that 8.6 million credit cards were on issue.

== Related organizations ==
- Payment Card Industry Security Standards Council - a network of financial institutions and vendors that manage the Payment Card Industry Data Security Standard
- Interac - an Interbank network in Canada that enables ATM cards issued by a financial institution that is a member of the network to be used to perform transactions through ATMs that belong to another member of the network.

== See also ==
- Payment gateway
- Payment system
- Payment processor
- Payment service provider
- RuPay
