= Card =

Card or The Card may refer to:

== Common uses ==
- Bank card
- Business card
- Calling or Visiting card
- Credit card
- Debit card
- Greeting card, given on special occasions
- Payment card
- Plastic card
- Playing card, used in games
- Postcard
- Trading card, aka collectible card

== Arts and entertainment ==
- The Card, a 1911 novel by Arnold Bennett
  - The Card (1922 film), based on the novel
  - The Card (1952 film), based on the novel
  - The Card (musical), 1973, based on the novel
- The Card, a 2012 novel by Graham Rawle
- "The Card" (The Twilight Zone), a TV episode
- "The Card", an episode of SpongeBob SquarePants (season 6)

== Businesses and organisations ==
- American Committee for Devastated France (Comité Américain pour les Régions Dévastées de France), a group of American women in France after World War I
- Campaign Against Racial Discrimination, a British organization, founded in 1964–67
- Center for Autism and Related Disorders, an American applied behavior analysis provider
- Wolfson Centre for Age-Related Diseases, at Guy's Hospital, London, England

== Science and technology ==
- Card, a device for carding, the cleaning and aligning of fibers
- CARD (domain), caspase recruitment domain in proteins
- Collegiate Aerial Robotics Demonstration, an American robotics competition
- Comprehensive Antibiotic Resistance Database, a biological database
- $\operatorname{card}$, a mathematical function that returns the cardinality of a set
- Printed circuit board, or card
- Punched card, also known as EAM card and Holerith card, an early input medium for accounting machines and computers
- Digital card, a physical or digital item

== Sport ==
- Card (sports), list of the matches taking place in a title match combat-sport event
- Arizona Cardinals, an American football team nicknamed the "Cards"
- St. Louis Cardinals, an American baseball team nicknamed the "Cards"
- Louisville Cardinals, the sports teams of the University of Louisville, nicknamed the "Cards"
- Woking F.C., an association football club, based in Surrey, England, nicknamed the "Cards"

== Other uses ==
- Card (surname), including a list of people with the name
- Community Assistance for Reconstruction, Development, and Stabilisation (CARDS) programme, the EU's financial assistance to the western Balkans

== See also ==
- Card game (disambiguation)
- Card holder (disambiguation)
- Cardinality (disambiguation)
- Carding (disambiguation)
- Carte (disambiguation)
- Bank card (disambiguation)
- Postcard (disambiguation)
- Calling card (disambiguation)
- Credit CARD Act of 2009 (Credit Card Accountability, Responsibility, and Disclosure Act of 2009), United States legislation
