= SCDP =

SCDP may refer to:

- South Carolina Democratic Party, in the United States
- Soviet Committee for the Defense of Peace, a state-sponsored organization in the Soviet Union
- Sterling Cooper Draper Pryce, a fictional company from the television series Mad Men

== See also ==
- Open Smart Card Development Platform (OpenSCDP)
- Sammarinese Christian Democratic Party (PDCS, from its Italian name Partito Democratico Cristiano Sammarinese)
- SCD prototile, a space-filling polyhedron
- South Carolina Department of Public Safety (SCDPS)
