= IDEX Biometrics =

Norwegian company

IDEX Biometrics ASA
- Company type: Public
- Traded as: OSE: IDEX; Nasdaq: IDBA (2021-23)
- Industry: Biometrics
- Founded: 1996; 30 years ago
- Headquarters: Oslo, Norway
- Key people: Anders Storbråten (CEO); Morten Opstad (chairman)
- Products: Fingerprint Sensors and Biometric Software
- Website: www.idexbiometrics.com

IDEX Biometrics ASA is a Norwegian biometrics company, specialising in fingerprint imaging and fingerprint recognition technology. The company was founded in 1996 and is headquartered in Oslo, but its main operation is in the UK, with an office in Farnborough outside of London.

IDEX offers fingerprint sensor and biometric software for identity cards, banking cards, smart cards, access control, healthcare, IOT and other security solutions. Fingerprint recognition is one form of biometric identification, other examples being DNA, face recognition, iris recognition and retinal scan as well as identification based on behavioral patterns such as speaker recognition, keystroke dynamics and signature recognition.

== Technology ==
In 2010, IDEX SmartFinger Film was launched, a thin and flexible fingerprint sensor that allows the entire fingerprint sensor system to be built into a standard plastic card, such as credit cards, bank cards and national ID cards. Such system-on-card solutions with a microprocessor running biometric algorithms and storage of biometric user data embedded ensure that biometric data never leaves the card itself. This safeguards privacy.

In the fall of 2012, IDEX changed its market focus. Until then, the company had emphasized the use of the technology in cards. The shift came after Apple acquired IDEX's competitor AuthenTec. This acquisition was a harbinger that fingerprint readers would be built into mobile phones, IDEX believed, which was reiterated when Apple introduced its iPhone with a fingerprint reader in the fall of 2013. Since then, several mobile manufacturers followed Apple's example and launched mobile phones with fingerprint solutions.

IDEX's SmartFinger Film sensor technology is based on polymer process technologies and offers small, ultra-thin and flexible swipe fingerprint sensors.

IDEX holds early patents for low-cost capacitive fingerprint sensors and has a cross-licence with Apple relating to this technology.

IDEX has demonstrated mobile phone-related technology implementations running on an Android platform, as well as a technology concept for fingerprint sensors built into the cover glass of mobile phones. Finger recognition solutions for Apple iPhone and iPad using SmartFinger have been launched.

IDEX's technology has also been integrated in biometric ISO-compliant cards. Fingerprint-based authentication of payment cards has gradually become the main focus of the company's efforts to commercialize its technology.

In March 2021, the company started shipping TrustedBio, a new generation of sensors specifically targeting the card market.

== Global Partners ==
IDEX has announced partnerships with global companies including Mastercard, IDEMIA, Chutian Dragon, Feitian, Goldpac, HED, Hengbao, Excelsecu, Infineon, and XH Smart Tech.
