= Carder =

Carder may refer to:

- Carder (name), a surname
- A practitioner of carding, a method of preparing wool for use as a textile
- A practitioner of carding, in the context of credit card fraud

== See also ==
- Carding (disambiguation)
