= Card (surname) =

Card is an English surname.

== Persons ==
Notable people with the surname include:

- Andrew Card (born 1947), American politician
- Charles Ora Card (1839–1906), American Mormon missionary and founder of Cardston, Alberta
- David Card (born 1956), Canadian-American labour economist
- Hudson Card (born 2001), American football player
- James Card (1915–2000), American film preservationist
- James C. Card (born 1942), United States Coast Guard admiral
- Lucia Zora Card (1877–1936), American animal trainer
- Michael Card (born 1957), American Christian singer-songwriter, author, and radio host
- Orson Scott Card (born 1951), American science fiction author
- Richard Card, co-editor of Card, Cross and Jones: Criminal Law
- Robert Card (1983–2023), American mass shooter

== Lists of people ==
- Robert Card (disambiguation), multiple people by this name, including Rob, Robbie, Robby

== See also ==
- Card (disambiguation)
- Cari (name)
