= Robert Card =

Robert Card or Rob Card is the name of:

- Robert James Card (1818–1888), Irish Anglican priest
- Robert G. Card (born 1953), American businessman
- Rob Card (rugby union) (born 1975), Canadian rugby union player
- Blackmill (musician), born Robert Card, British musician
- Robert Russell Card II (1983–2023), perpetrator of the 2023 Lewiston shootings
- Rob Card, Canadian rugby player in the 1997 Rugby World Cup Sevens squads
- Robby Card, American racecar driver, 2007 champion of the IMSA Prototype Challenge

== See also ==
- Robert H. McCard (1918–1944), posthumous U.S. Medal of Honor recipient
- Rob (cards), an action in some card games
- Robert (disambiguation)
- Card (disambiguation)
