= Carder (surname) =

Carder is a surname of English origin, derived from the occupation of carding. Notable people with the surname include:

- Alex Carder (born 1989), American football quarterback
- Angela Carder (1960–1987), American cancer patient, focus of a medical ethics debate over women's rights versus fetal rights
- Frederick Carder (1863–1963), English-American artist and glass maker
- Karle Carder-Andrews (born 1989), English footballer
- Kenneth Lee Carder (born 1940), American Bishop
- Matthew Carder (born 1993), Scottish badminton player
- Muriel Spurgeon Carder (1922–2023), Canadian Baptist minister
- Peter Carder (fl. 1577–1586), British mariner
- Ricky "Tank" Carder (born 1989), American football player
- Barnaby "Barn The Spoon" Carder (born 1981), British Green Woodworker and Spoon Carver

== See also ==
- Carder (disambiguation)
- Carder England (1988–2024), American poker player
