= Stored-value card =

Payment card with a monetary value stored on the card itself

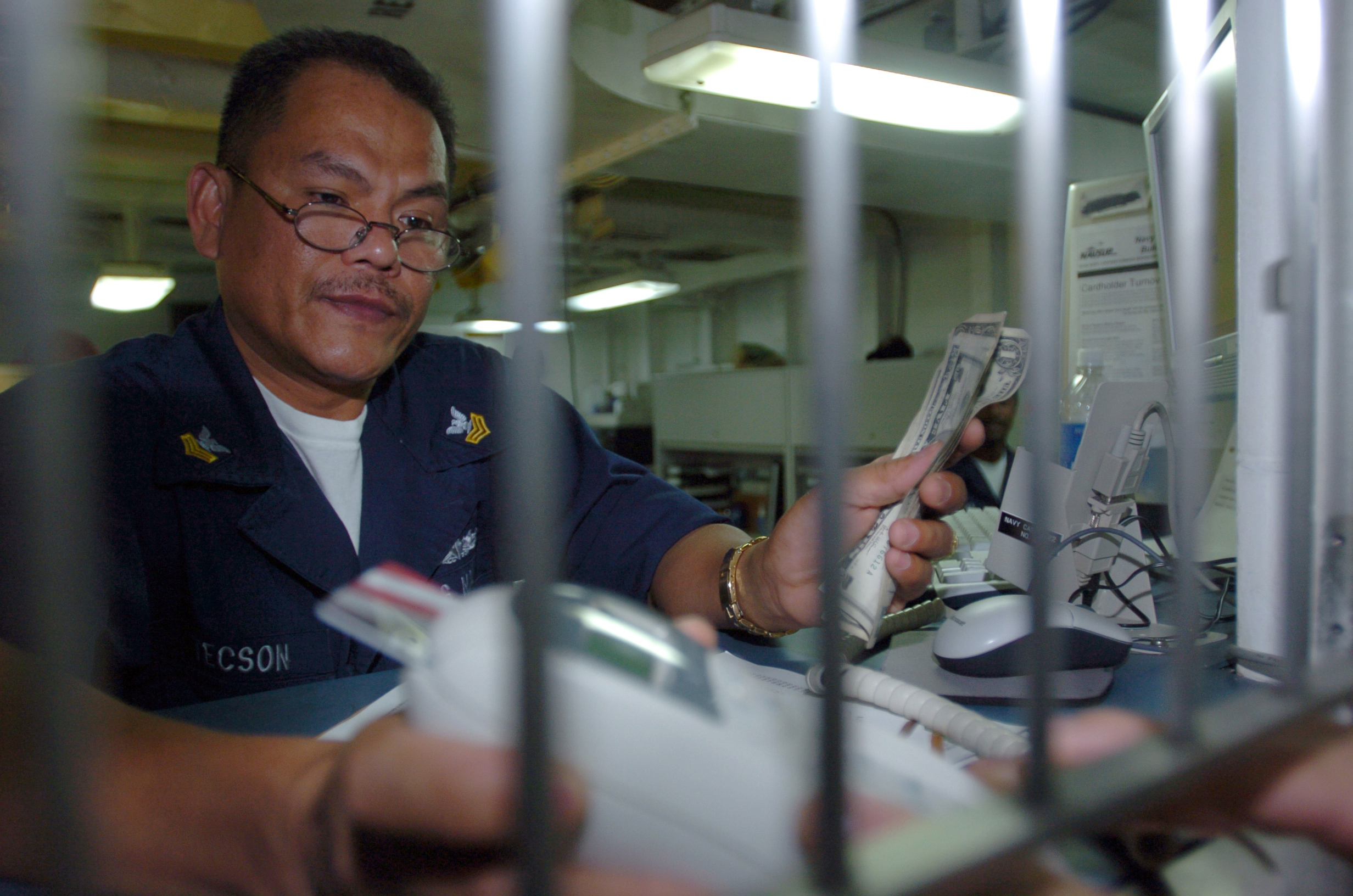
A U.S. Navy clerk holds a keypad for a customer to enter his Navy Cash Card personal identification number aboard the amphibious assault ship USS Peleliu (LHA-5). The system requires sailors to add money from their personal bank accounts to one of two systems held on the cash card.

A stored-value card (SVC) or cash card is a payment card with a monetary value stored on the card itself, not in an external account maintained by a financial institution. This means no network access is required by the payment collection terminals as funds can be withdrawn and deposited straight from the card. Like cash, payment cards can be used anonymously as the person holding the card can use the funds. They are an electronic development of token coins and are typically used in low-value payment systems or where network access is difficult or expensive to implement, such as parking machines, public transport systems, and closed payment systems in locations such as ships.

Stored-value cards differ from debit cards, where money is on deposit with the issuer, and credit cards which are subject to credit limits set by the issuer and are connected to accounts at financial institutions. Another difference between stored-value cards and debit and credit cards is that debit and credit cards are usually issued in the name of individual account holders, while stored-value cards may be anonymous, as in the case of gift cards. Stored-value cards are prepaid money cards and may be disposed when the value is used, or the card value may be topped up, as in the case of telephone calling cards or when used as a fare card.

The term closed-loop means the funds and/or data are physically stored on the token or card in the form of binary-coded data. This is unlike payment cards where data is maintained on the card issuer's computers. Like payment cards, value can be accessed using a magnetic stripe, chip or radio-frequency identification (RFID) embedded in the card; or by entering a code number, printed on the card, into a telephone or other numeric keypad.

== Names ==
There is no common name for stored-value cards, which are country or company specific. Names for stored-value cards include APPH in US, Mondex in Canada, Chipknip in the Netherlands, Geldkarte in Germany, Quick in Austria, Moneo in France, Proton in Belgium, Carta prepagata ("Prepaid card") in Italy, FeliCa-cards such as Suica in Japan, China T-Union in mainland China, EZ-Link and NETS (CashCard and FlashPay) in Singapore, Papara Card in Turkey, Octopus card in Hong Kong, SUBE card in Argentina, Beep in the Philippines and Touch 'n Go and MyRapid Card in Malaysia.

The U.S. Department of the Treasury manages three stored-value card programs: EZpay, EagleCash, and Navy Cash. Non-government stored-value cards include Aramark GuestExpress, Compass Zipthru, and Freedompay FreetoGo.

== Uses ==
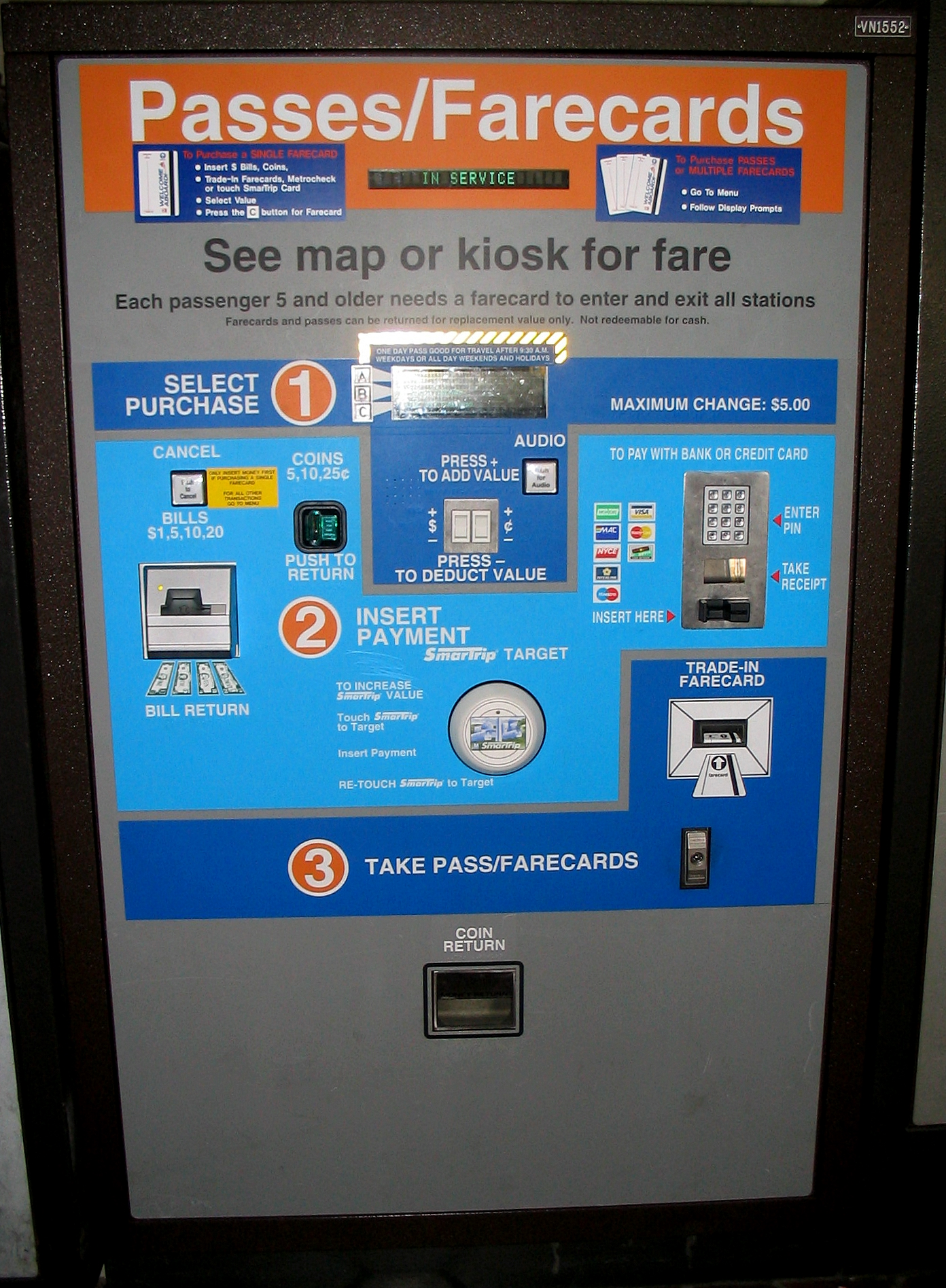
A vending machine sells farecards for the Washington Metro subway.

Stored-value cards are most commonly used for low-value transactions, such as transit system farecards, telephone prepaid calling cards, cafeterias, or for micropayments in shops or vending machines. They also have an advantage over most other payment cards in that when making, say, a purchase, telecommunication facilities are not needed, which may be important in situations where the availability or reliability of these facilities are uncertain or costly, especially for low-value transactions. A benefit to the merchant is that bank transaction fees are not incurred as the transaction is processed offline and there need not be a reference to the bank for processing.

The German Geldkarte and the Austrian Quick card can also be used to validate a customer's age at cigarette vending machines.

Typical applications of organization specific or industry specific prepaid card include payroll cards, rebate cards, gift cards, cafeteria cards and travel cards and U.S. based health schemes such as HSA cards. The EZpay, EagleCash, and Navy Cash cards are used by the U.S. military as electronic alternatives to cash in areas characterized by difficult access and limited banking or telecommunications infrastructure.

Stored-value cards can save organizations a considerable amount of money if customers add a large sum of funds at one time to the card and then pay a lower transaction fee for each use of the card on smaller purchases.

== Prepaid cards ==
=== Closed system prepaid cards ===
Closed system prepaid cards are cards issued by a merchant and may only be redeemed for purchases from the merchant. They are typically of fixed amounts and are commonly known as merchant gift cards or store cards. These cards are typically purchased to be used as gifts, and are increasingly replacing the traditional paper gift certificate.

Generally, few if any laws govern these types of cards. Card issuers or sellers are not required to obtain a license. Closed system prepaid cards are not subject to the USA PATRIOT Act, as they generally cannot identify a customer.

As debts owed to consumers who purchased the card, these purchases remain on the books of a merchant as a liability rather than an asset. Consequently, gift certificates and merchant gift cards have fallen under state escheat or abandoned property laws (APL). However, the emergence of closed system prepaid cards has blurred the applicability of APL. North Carolina and Illinois have excluded these types of cards from APL provided the card has no expiration date or a service fee. Maine and Virginia require the issuer to pay the state when the cards are abandoned. In Connecticut an issuer is required to identify the residence of the gift card owner. Since most merchant gift cards are anonymous, the residence of the card's owner is deemed to be the state's treasurer's office.

Presently, no law requires a merchant to provide refunds for lost or stolen cards. Whether a refund is possible is specified in an issuer's cardholder agreement. In addition, most closed system cards cannot be redeemed for cash. When a cardholder redeems all but an insignificant portion of the card on merchandise, that amount is generally lost and is a windfall gain for the issuing merchant. The merchant also obtains a windfall gain if a card has an expiry date and the cardholder fails to use the full value by that date. Furthermore, the merchant has an interest-free use of the value until it is redeemed.

=== Semi-closed system prepaid cards ===
Semi-closed system prepaid cards are similar to closed system prepaid cards. However, cardholders are permitted to redeem the cards at multiple merchants within a geographic area. These types of cards are issued by a third party, rather than the retailer who accepts the card. Examples include university cards and mall gift cards. The laws governing these types of cards are unsettled. Depending on the state, the issuer may or may not be required to have a money transmitter license or other similar license. In addition to the District of Columbia, the states in the US that require a license include Connecticut, Florida, Illinois, Iowa, Louisiana, Maryland, Minnesota, Mississippi, North Carolina, Oregon, Texas, Vermont, Virginia, West Virginia, Washington, and Wyoming. Note, these states explicitly require licensing for card issuers. Other states may have more subtle licensing laws. Under 18 USC section 1960, it is a crime for an issuer to conduct a money transmitting business without a license. Cardholders generally suffer from the same problems that closed system card holders suffer. It is unclear whether or not Chapters 7 and 11 of the Bankruptcy code are applicable to these types of cards.

== Money laundering ==
It is common for countries to place limits on how much currency may be taken out of or brought into a country. However, these limits generally do not apply to money leaving a country in non-cash forms such as on stored-value cards. There is concern that stored-value cards can be used for money laundering, that is, moving offshore funds derived from criminal activities such as drug trafficking. There are reports of these cards being used by Mexican drug cartels to transfer money across borders.

For example, in the United States, it is legal for anyone to enter or leave the country with money that is stored on cards, and (unlike cash in high amounts) does not have to be reported to customs or any other authority. Some members of the U.S. Congress are considering creating laws that would require travelers crossing, entering, or leaving the country to report these cards. The Financial Crimes Enforcement Network of the U.S. Department of the Treasury has published a notice of proposed rulemaking on stored-value cards in the June 28, 2010 edition of the Federal Register. The proposed rules would require sellers of prepaid cards to register with the government and keep records on transactions and customers.

== See also ==
- Card (disambiguation)
- Prepaid credit card
- Scrip
- Gift card
- Telephone card
- Electronic money
- Decoupled debit card

== Sources ==
- Hughes, Sarah Jane; Middlebrook, Stephen T.; Peterson, Broox W. (Nov 2006), "Developments In The Law Concerning Stored Value and Other Prepaid Payment Products", Business Lawyer
- Rinearson, Judith; Woods, Chris (Nov–Dec 2004), "Beware Strangers Bearing Gift Cards" (PDF), Business Law Today, vol. 14, no. 2, archived from the original (PDF) on 2016-10-20
- "A Conversation with Terry Goddard, Attorney General of Arizona", Washington Post, 2009-04-05
