= Decoupled debit card =

A decoupled debit card is a debit card in the US that is not issued by and not tied to any particular retail financial institution, such as a bank or credit union. This is based on the ability in the US ACH Network payment system to make an electronic payment from any bank or credit union without needing to use a card issued by the bank or credit union. A third party, such as a retailer, can create a decoupled debit card which will use this system to make a payment from the customer's checking account. They may do this as part of a loyalty scheme or to reduce their own debit card processing costs.

== History ==
In May 2007, Capital One began a one-year decoupled debit card experiment. This card was novel in that prior to this launch, a debit card was always tied to a traditional financial institution. Capital One's MasterCard-branded decoupled card did not require an account be opened with a retail financial institution, and was made in partnership with the Ukrops grocery chain, based in Capital One's hometown of Richmond, Virginia. The card was also tied to a reward program offered by Ukrops. The one-year experiment ended in May 2008, and was followed by a national rollout of its own version of a decoupled debit card tied to its own reward program.

Decoupled Debit gained the attention of the financial services industry in May 2007 when Capital One announced they were going to add a decoupled debit card product. At the time Capital One did not offer checking accounts—only credit cards and this was a strategy to offer a debit card without actually owning the checking account relationship. The one year pilot ended without Capital One citing specific reasons as to why, leaving the industry with only speculation as to why.

Today, decoupled debit cards are typically issued and branded by retailers without any association to a national network such as Visa, MasterCard or Amex. The retailer has complete control over the issuing of the cards to their customers and the processing of the payment. By definition, decoupled debit cards are processed via the Federal Reserve ACH System as the mechanism for reaching a consumer’s checking account as a debit to their account for their purchase. The payment side of the product operates like an electronic check, but the product is more than just a payment card.

When the Durbin Amendment became law in October 2011, there was new speculation that this was the end of decoupled debit. At the time there were only two main companies offering decoupled debit: Tempo and National Payment Card Association. Tempo did in fact close their doors shortly after the roll-out of the Durbin Amendment—National Payment Card Association (NPCA) did not and is still thriving today in 2013.

Why one survived Durbin and the other did not is a function of their differences in business models and program structures. Tempo had a product model tied to Discover and accepted signature debit which resulted in a pricing model and risk profile that would no longer be attractive to retailers under Durbin.

National Payment Card Association has a different pricing model – generally a fixed price per transaction of $.15 that retailers pay in processing fees, which is still very competitive even under Durbin regulation. The company also has a well articulated and easily understood value proposition for retailers:

Retailers reap swipe fee savings when they have a National Payment Card program when compared to what they pay in swipe fees for accepting Visa, MasterCard, AMEX, etc. The savings are used to fund rewards to the retailer’s customers which provides the incentive to the consumer to carry another payment card in their wallet.

The Target Red Card program is an example of how the value proposition works. Consumers enroll with Target, provide their checking account to be debited and receive 5% discount at the register when they use the Red Card to pay.

NPCA on the other hand has developed their niche in c-store petroleum. The programs offer consumers an instant price rollback at the pump of anywhere between 3 cents and 10 cents off per gallon of fuel purchased. The programs offer another benefit to retailers and that is in building a customer data base. Since the consumer enrolls (generally online) into the program, the retailer gains baseline information about their cardholders (name, address, phone number, email addresses, etc.) and they gain the ability to track spending. This is information banks typically have when a customer uses a bank-issued payment card. Now the retailer has the information and can mine the data for use in targeted marketing to their customers.

On a going forward basis, the real payoff for decoupled debit might very well end up to be mobile payments. The most noted program in this early life cycle of mobile payment using decoupled debit is Cumberland Farms SmartPay. In this program, consumers can have a mobile payment app, a traditional mag stripe card, or both. The program tracks lifetime savings within the app and coupons and promotions can be delivered to the app while the Cumberland Farms customers are fueling.

In October 2013 payments technology firm FIS announced a new private label, decoupled debit product called InterPayment. InterPayment utilizes proprietary FIS technology and payment processing platforms.

== See also ==
- Stored-value card
- Durbin Amendment
