= Postcards (disambiguation) =

Postcards are pieces of thick paper or thin cardboard.

Postcards may also refer to:

- Postcards (memorial), a 9/11 memorial on Staten Island, New York, US
- Postcards (novel), a novel by E. Annie Proulx
- Postcards Records, an American jazz record label active during the 1990s

== TV series ==
- Postcards (Australian TV series), Australian television series
- Postcards (2024 TV series), Nigerian-Indian television series

== Music ==
- Postcards (Cindy Morgan album)
- Postcards (Peter Ostroushko album)
- Postcards (Sparkadia album)
- Postcards, an album by Tom Landa and the Paperboys
- "Postcards", a song by The Blizzards from Domino Effect
- "Postcards", a song by Faithless from Sunday 8PM
- "Postcards" (James Blunt song), a song from Moon Landing
- Postcards (band), an indie folk band from Beirut, Lebanon

== See also ==
- Postcard (disambiguation)
