= Geldkarte =

German electronic card payment system

GeldKarte (German: "money card") was a stored-value card used as an electronic cash system in Germany from 1996 to 2024. It operated as an offline smart card for small payments at installations like vending machines and to pay for public transport or parking tickets. It was a prepaid card and funds were loaded onto the card using ATMs or dedicated charging machines. The system has been abandoned in December 2024 due to most customers now relying on more modern contactless payment options.

== History ==
GeldKarte acceptance logo

GeldKarte was introduced in 1996 and suffered from low-acceptance during its existence, citing the prepaid model as impractical for its originally intended use in retail stores.

Since 1 January 2007, the GeldKarte could have been used for mandatory age verification at German cigarette vending machines instead of a German identity card or driver's licence. This caused an increase in use of the GeldKarte system, which suffered from very low demand in its first ten years. Several usage statistics peaked in 2007, including number of payments made and total amount paid with the GeldKarte. As of 2009, 132 million Euros were spent through the GeldKarte system. The average transaction had a value of €3. However, usage numbers were already decreasing again at this point.

In 2015, Deutsche Post removed GeldKarte acceptance from their stamp vending machines citing low demand. As of 2018, less than 1 percent of all issued cards with GeldKarte functionality were being used.

As of 2020, both GeldKarte and its contactless counterpart girogo were in the process of being phased-out and new cards were no longer being issued due to decreased demand. In 2022, the system had been announced to be shut down by 2024, when all remaining cards will have been replaced by Girocards with contactless payment functionality.

On 31 December 2024, the GeldKarte system was closed with stored value to be credited back until March 2025. Similar systems operated in Europe were Chipknip, Moneo and Quick which all were abandoned years earlier.
