= Card holder =

Card holder or cardholder may refer to:

- A person who owns a card, such as a cardholder of a credit card or debit card
- A device which holds a card, such as a SIM card

== See also ==
- Card (disambiguation)
- Holder (disambiguation)
