= Bank card (disambiguation) =

A Bank card is a card issued by a bank to give a client access to funds in various ways. It may also refer to:

- Bankcard, a defunct Australian credit card scheme
- Bankard, a credit card issuer in the Philippines
- North American Bancard, a card transaction services provider
- Magnetic stripe card, commonly used for credit cards and debit cards
