= Cardinality (disambiguation) =

Cardinality may refer to:

- Cardinality of a set, a measure of the "number of elements" of a set in mathematics
- Cardinality of a musical set, the number of pitch classes
- Cardinality (data modeling), a term in database design, e.g. many-to-many or one-to-many relationships
- Cardinality (SQL statements), a term used in SQL statements which describes the "uniqueness" of the data in a given column
- Cardinal utility, in contrast with ordinal utility, in economics
