= Quick Wertkarte =

Quick was an electronic purse system available on Austrian bank cards to allow small purchases to be made without cash. It was in use from 1996 until 31 July 2017.

== Functionality ==
The system was aimed at small retailers such as bakeries, cafés, drink, and parking automats but also supermarkets such as Billa accepted it. Quick was intended for purchases of less than €400. The card was inserted into a handheld reader by the merchant who enters the transaction amount for the customer. The customer then confirmed the purchase by pushing a button on the keypad, the exact amount debited from the card within a few seconds.

As well as the multipurpose bank card version, anonymous cards (also smart cards) were available for the use of people without bank accounts, such as children and tourists. At ATMs, one was able to transfer money for free between bank cards and the Quick chip either on a standalone smart card, or contained in the bank card. The scheme was operated by Europay Austria and most of the Maestro cards in use then contained Quick support.

As of 2015, less than 10 percent of all Austrian banking customers used their Quick functionality.

== See also ==
- Chipknip
- Geldkarte
- Moneo
