= Peter Carder =

English mariner

- Occupation: Mariner

Peter Carder (fl. 1577–1586) was an English mariner.

== Biography ==
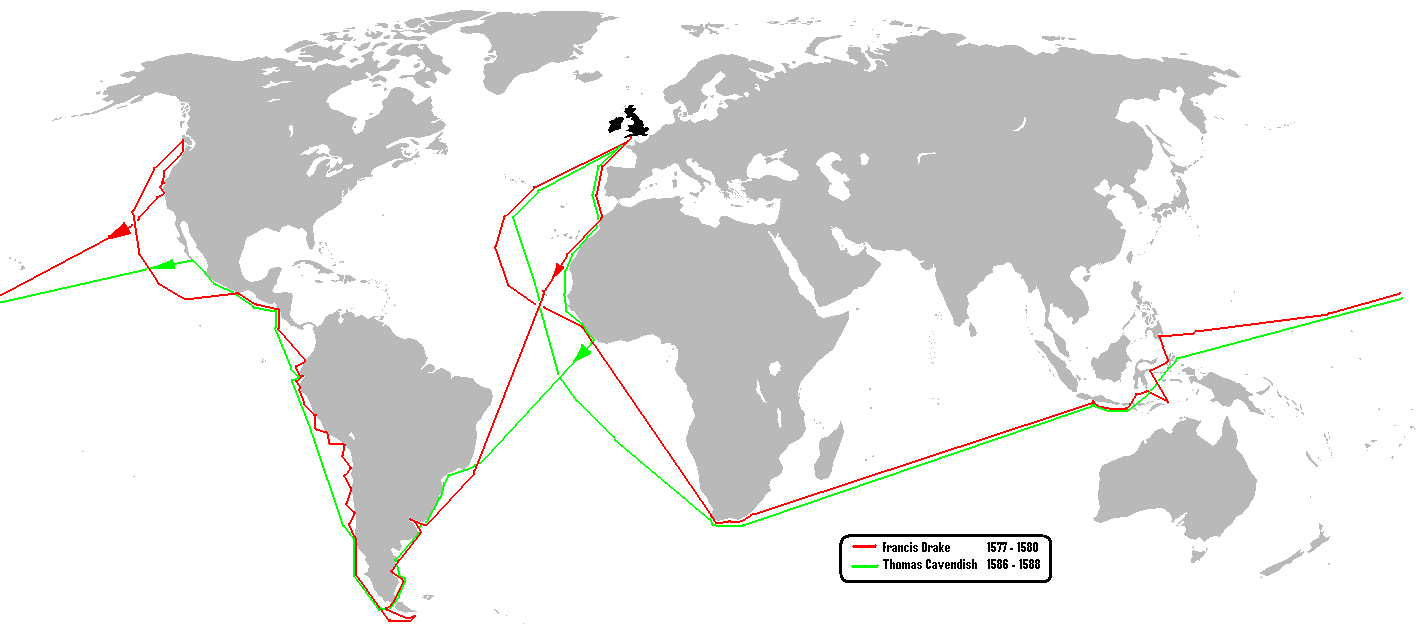
Map of Drakes voyage

Carder of St. Veriun in Cornwall, who, according to his own story, a seaman of the Pelican with Francis Drake when she sailed from England on her voyage round the world in November 1577. In October 1578, the ship being then in the Straits of Magellan, Carder was one of eight men in the pinnace who in a gale lost sight of the ship, and, not being able to sight her again, made the mainland and followed along the shore to St. Julian, living on shellfish and such fish as they could catch. From St. Julian they made to the river Plata, and crossing to the north side wandered into the woods, leaving two men in the boat. They fell in with the natives, who attacked them, captured four of the party, and chased the others to the boat, in which they managed to escape, though all badly wounded. They got to an island some three leagues distant from the shore, where two of the wounded men died, Carder and another William Pitcher, by name, being left the sole survivors. A gale on and smashed their boat on the rocks, and for some two months they supported life on sand eels, little crabs, and a fruit resembling an orange, but for want of water they were reduced to the most direful straits. At length some driftwood came ashore, they managed to make a raft, and, provisioning it as best they could, put to sea. It was three days and two nights before they reached the land, when, coming to "a little river of very sweet and pleasant water", Pitcher drank to such excess that he died within half an hour. Carder after this met with a tribe of savages who received him as a friend, he stayed with them for some time, learned their language, taught them to make and use shields and clubs — for before they were armed only with bows and arrows — and led them against a neighbouring tribe, which they completely defeated, and took many prisoners, most of whom they roasted and devoured. Afterwards he was permitted to leave this tribe, and made his way northwards to Bahia and Pemambuco, whence after some delay he embarked for Europe; and so, after some further adventures, he arrived in England in November 1586.

The whole story is related at length in "Purchas, his Pilgrimes", as though in Carder's own words. The presumption is that it was written by Carder and supplied by him to Samuel Purchas. It is therefore necessary to point out that the very remarkable narrative rests entirely on Carder's own testimony, is not corroborated by any other, and is virtually contradicted by very high authority on the one important point on which contradiction was possible. In the narrative of the Pelican's voyage (The World encompassed by Sir Francis Drake, Hakluyt Soc.), while many trifling things are carefully recorded, there is no mention of the loss of the pinnace with eight men. It is barely possible that the omission is an oversight; it is much more probable that there was no such loss to record, and that, from beginning to end, the story is a fiction. Of the narrator we have no other knowledge. The narrative speaks of him as still alive in 1618, and apparently in 1626, when the "Pilgrimes" was published.
