= Robert James Card =

Anglican priest in Ireland

Robert James Card (1818–1888) was an Anglican priest in Ireland during the 19th century.

Card was born in Dublin and educated at Trinity College, Dublin. He was the incumbent at Kilcommock; and Archdeacon of Ardagh from 1875 until 1883.
