= Collegiate Aerial Robotics Demonstration =

US robotics competition

- Most recent season or competition: 2013
- Sport: Robotics-related games
- Founded: CARD Planning Committee
- First season: 2011
- No. of teams: 10 teams
- Country: United States

The Collegiate Aerial Robotics Demonstration (CARD) is a defunct robotics competition for college and university students inspired by FIRST. The inaugural event was held at the 2011 FIRST Championship in St. Louis, Missouri.

== History ==
The possibility of a college-level FIRST competition has been discussed for many years. At the 2010 FIRST Championship in Atlanta, Georgia, a group of college students and faculty were invited to a discussion in which FIRST Founders Dean Kamen and Woodie Flowers and Editor-in-chief of Wired Magazine Chris Anderson proposed the idea of a college-level FIRST program. Chris Anderson suggested the inclusion of aerial robots in the college level program and demonstrated a robotic quadcopter (a Parrot AR.Drone) and an RC blimp. As a result of the meeting, a planning committee was formed to design and promote a college-level program, chaired by Dr. Karina J. Powell and Dr. Christopher L. Jones. In December 2010, a kickoff video was released giving an overview of the program. Further documents and team updates have established and clarified the demonstration competition and game rules. The possibility of having a full college-level FIRST competition is still being discussed.

== Games ==
=== 2011 ===
There are two games played on fields equivalent to the FRC standard size (54 feet by 27 feet). For both games there were two competing alliances, each with two teams each composed of one air vehicle and one ground vehicle.

The first game, All Your Base, involves a 3 by 3 grid of 4'6" tall rectangular bases. Ground robots capture bases by shooting projectiles (tennis balls) through openings on one or two sides of the base. Aerial robots capture bases by picking up a virtual payload from their starting location and then landing on top of the base. Teams score bonus points by capturing three bases in a row.

The second game is The Best Trajectory. Ground robots score points by shooting projectiles across a large trapezoidal barrier placed at midfield into mobile goals on the other side. Aerial robots can retrieve foam cube "payloads" from the top of the barrier and drop them into the goals to multiply the score of that goal. Drivers will not be able to see past the barrier. Teams may use their aerial robots to relay targeting data from the other side of the barrier. This game was never played at the 2011 demonstration in order to maintain the learning curve for teams playing All Your Base, as the result of a collective team and planning committee decision.

A third game design, named FIRST Flight, was removed from the schedule for the inaugural competition and was replaced with a practice course for the aerial robots.

=== 2012 ===
CARD and FIRST severed their relationship after the 2011 season. However, the schools and organizations involved in CARD are working toward setting up a separate competition to continue this program.

The 2012 game, whose tournament was to be held at the Milwaukee School of Engineering, involved robots trying to score in a series of towers. If an alliance scores at a rapid rate, they will have an additional tower available for them to score in for a short period of time. Due to circumstances beyond the teams control, the 2012 competition was postponed.

=== 2013 ===
For the 2013 season, the Milwaukee School of Engineering hosted the competition on April 5 and 6. Milwaukee School of Engineering, University of Wisconsin-Platteville, and Virginia Tech competed. Oakland University had to drop out at the last minute due to a fatal crash to their quadcopter.

== Colleges/universities involved ==
=== Teams ===
Team Number	School	Team name	2011 Season	2012 Season	2013 Season
1	Illinois Institute of Technology	Illinois Tech Robotics	Yes	No	No
2	Oakland University	OUFO's	Yes	Yes	Yes
3	Pace University	Reboot Robotics	Yes	No	No
4	University of Wisconsin-Platteville	Defying Gravity	Yes	Yes	Yes
5	University of Minnesota	GO FIRST	Yes	Yes	No
6	Milwaukee School of Engineering	SCOE Robotics	Yes	Yes	Yes
7	University of Illinois Urbana-Champaign	IlliniBots	Yes	No	No
8	Embry-Riddle Aeronautical University (Florida campus)	?	Yes	No	No
9	University of Washington	Dawgbytes	Yes	Yes	No
10	Clarkson University	?	Yes	No	No
11	University of Kentucky	Circuit Jockeys	No	Yes	No
12	Iowa State University	Cool Clowder	No	Yes	No
13	Embry–Riddle Aeronautical University (Arizona campus)	Eagles	No	Yes	No
14	University of Memphis	Tiger Robotics	No	Yes	No
15	Stevens Institute of Technology	Stevens Ducks	No	Yes	No
16	Virginia Tech	?	No	No	Yes

=== Other Involvement ===
- Worcester Polytechnic Institute
- Baker College

== See also ==
- International Aerial Robotics Competition
