= Card game (disambiguation) =

A card game is any game using playing cards.

Card game may also refer to:

- Jeu de cartes (Stravinsky) ('Card Game'), a ballet
- Card Game (The Price Is Right), a segment game on US TV series
- "Card Game" (Black Summer), a TV episode

== See also ==
- List of card games by number of cards
- List of video game genres § Board game or card game
