= Bank card =

Card issued by a bank to its clients

UML class diagram depicting a bank account

A Bank Card is typically a plastic card issued by a bank to its clients that performs one or more of a number of services that relate to giving the client access to a bank account.

Physically, a bank card will usually have the client's name, the issuer's name, and a unique card number printed on it. It will have a magnetic strip on the back enabling various machines to read and access information. Depending on the issuing bank and the preferences of the client, this may allow the card to be used as an ATM card, enabling transactions at automated teller machines; or as a debit card, linked to the client's bank account and able to be used for making purchases at the point of sale with a bank card using a payment terminal. Later, in 2010s, smart card technology was adopted for bank card.

The first bank cards were ATM cards issued by Barclays in London, in 1967, and by Chemical Bank in Long Island, New York, in 1969. In 1972, Lloyds Bank issued the first bank card to feature a personal identification number (PIN) for security along with the information-encoding magnetic strip.

Historically, bank cards have also served the purpose of a cheque guarantee card, a now almost defunct system to guarantee cheques at points of sale.

== See also ==
- Card (disambiguation)
- ATM card
- Charge card, payment card with balance paid in full by a due date
- Credit card
- Debit card
- Payment card
- Plastic card
- Purchasing card
- Stored-value card
