= Moneo =

Moneo, sometimes branded as mon€o, was an electronic purse system available on French bank cards to allow small purchases to be made without cash used from 1999 to 2015.

== History ==
Moneo is based on the German system Geldkarte. It was launched in Tours on 30 September 1999 by economy minister Dominique Strauss-Kahn. Supported by all French banks, Moneo was tested in Brittany and Montpellier in 2002, and from 2004 Moneo has been added to most French bank cards.

The system had been aimed at small retailers such as bakeries and cafés and intended for purchases of less than €30. The card was inserted into a handheld Moneo reader by the merchant who entered the transaction amount for the customer. The customer then confirmed the purchase by pushing a button on the keypad; the exact amount was debited from the card within a few seconds. As well as the multipurpose bank card version, anonymous cards (also smart cards) were available for the use of people without bank accounts, such as children and tourists.

== See also ==
- Geldkarte
- Octopus card
- Quick Wertkarte
- Chipknip
