= Postcard (disambiguation) =

A postcard or post card is a rectangular piece of thick paper or thin cardboard intended for writing and mailing without an envelope.

Postcard may also refer to:

== Arts and entertainment ==
=== Books ===
- The Post Card, a 1980 book by Jacques Derrida
- The Postcard, a 2009 children's novel by Tony Abbott
- The Postcard (novel) (La Carte postale), a 2021 novel by Anne Berest

=== Film ===
- Postcard (2010 film), a Japanese film
- Postcard (2014 film), an Indian film

=== Music ===
- Post Card (album), album by Mary Hopkin
- Postcard Records, an independent record label based in Glasgow

==== Songs ====
- "Postcard" (The Who song), by The Who from Odds & Sods
- "Postcard" (Steven Wilson song), by Steven Wilson from Grace for Drowning
- "The Postcard", by Boris Grebenshchikov from Radio Silence
- "Postcard", by The Hollies from Butterfly
- "Postcard", by The Huntingtons from Self-titled Album
- "Postcard", by Iron & Wine from Archive Series Volume No. 1
- "Postcard", by The Lemonheads from Creator
- "Postcard", by Troye Sivan featuring Gordi from Bloom
- "Postcard", by First Aid Kit (band)

== Technology ==
- POST card, a computer diagnostic tool

== See also ==
- Postcards (disambiguation)
