= Open Smart Card Development Platform =

Collection of tools for smart card applications

OpenSCDP
- Developers: CardContact Software & System Consulting
- Written in: Java
- Operating system: Cross-platform
- Type: Integrated Development Environment
- License: GPL
- Website: www.openscdp.org

The Open Smart Card Development Platform (OpenSCDP) is a collection of tools that support users in the development, test and deployment of smart card applications. The platform supports GlobalPlatform Scripting, Profile and Messaging technology.

The complete toolset is written in Java and uses ECMAScript as a scripting language. Access to smart cards is provided through an enhanced version of the OpenCard Framework. Drivers are included for most ISO/IEC 7816-4 compliant smart cards, PC/SC and CT-API card readers. The platform also provides cryptographic support through the Java Cryptography Extension (JCE) with the Bouncy Castle Crypto API.

The toolsets and libraries of OpenSCDP are provided as Open Source under the GNU General Public License (GPL).

== Architecture ==
OpenSCDP utilizes a set of Open Source tools including:

- Eclipse
- OpenCard Framework
- Rhino JavaScript-Engine
- BouncyCastle Crypto Library

== Components ==
The OpenSCDP framework consists of several key tools:

- Smart Card Shell (SCSH3): An interactive, GUI and command-line execution environment for running JavaScript scripts against smart cards at both the APDU and file system levels.
- Smart Card Scripting Environment for Eclipse (SSE4E): An Eclipse plugin providing script editing, auto-completion, and debugging for smart card script developers.
- Scripting Server: A server-side web application interface that allows smart card scripts and key-management procedures to be executed in server environments.

== Supported Standards and Applications ==
OpenSCDP includes pre-configured script suites and class libraries supporting several major smart card profiles and standards:

- ICAO Doc 9303: Testing and script support for ePassports and electronic machine-readable travel documents (eMRTD).
- EMV: Support for payment card applications, APDU logging, and testing.
- PKI and SmartCard-HSM: Integration with Public Key Infrastructures, X.509 certificate handling, OCSP, PKCS 11, and hardware security modules such as the SmartCard-HSM.
- GlobalPlatform: Support for GlobalPlatform Scripting specifications, Secure Channel Protocols (including SCP02 and SCP03), and security domains.
