= Calling card =

Calling card may refer to:

== Cards ==
- Visiting card, a card carried by individuals to present themselves to others
- Business card, a small card with business information that is given for convenience and as a memory aid
- Tart card, an ad stuck to a phone box to advertise the services of a call girl
- Telephone card, a small card, usually resembling a credit card, used to pay for telephone services

== Other uses ==
- Calling card (crime), a signature token or characteristic of a crime used by a serial criminal
- Slang for animal feces, especially when encountered in an undesirable place
- Calling Card, a 1976 album by Irish blues-rock musician Rory Gallagher
- "Calling Card" (Suspects), a 2014 television episode
