= Carding (disambiguation) =

Carding a mechanical process that aligns cotton, wool or other fibers in the manufacture of textiles.

Carding may also refer to:

- Carding (fraud), a range of credit card fraud activities
- Carding (police policy), an intelligence gathering policy of certain Canadian police departments
- Carding brush, used when rust bluing steel
- Carding Mill Valley, a small valley near Church Stretton, England
- Hole carding, advantage technique in the game of casino 21
- Carding, the use of signals in contract bridge
- Carding, in North America, requesting a customer to show an identity document as proof of age
- The Canadian Athlete Assistance Program, also called "the carding program", a program where elite athletes in Canada receive funding from the government
