= Debit card =

Card used for financial transactions

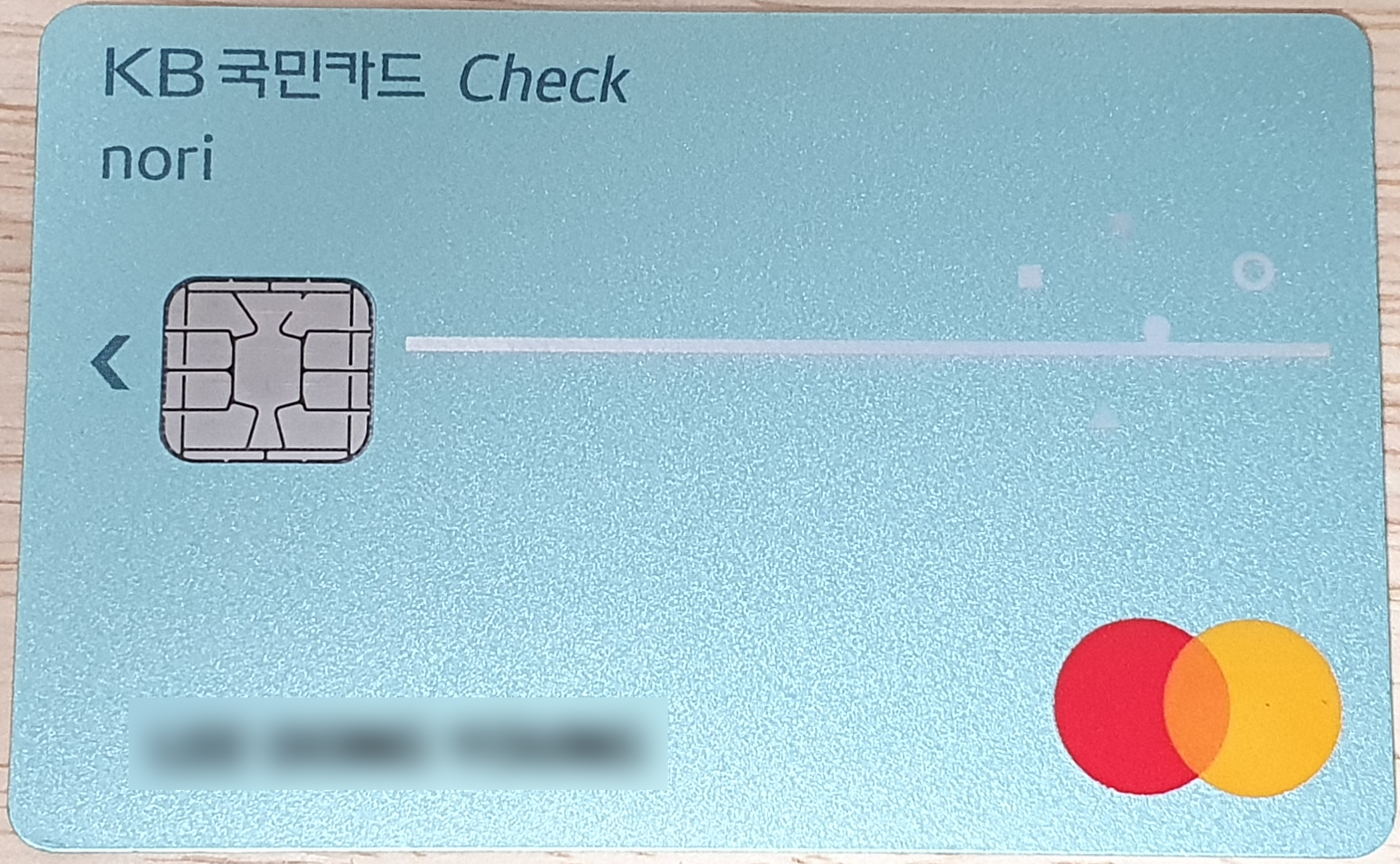
A Kookmin Bank debit card

A debit card, also known as a check card, cheque card or bank card, is a payment card that can be used in place of cash to make purchases. The card usually consists of the bank's name, a card number, the cardholder's name, and an expiration date, on either the front or the back. Many new cards now have a chip on them, which allows people to use their card by touch (contactless), or by inserting the card and keying in a PIN as with swiping the magnetic stripe. Debit cards are similar to a credit card, but the money for the purchase must be in the cardholder's bank account at the time of the purchase and is immediately transferred directly from that account to the merchant's account to pay for the purchase.

Some debit cards carry a stored value with which a payment is made (prepaid cards), but most relay a message to the cardholder's bank to withdraw funds from the cardholder's designated bank account. In some cases, the payment card number is assigned exclusively for use on the Internet, and there is no physical card. This is referred to as a virtual card.

In many countries, the use of debit cards has become so widespread that they have overtaken checks in volume or have entirely replaced them; in some instances, debit cards have also largely replaced cash transactions. The development of debit cards, unlike credit cards and charge cards, has generally been country-specific, resulting in a number of different systems around the world that are often incompatible. Since the mid-2000s, a number of initiatives have allowed debit cards issued in one country to be used in other countries and allowed their use for internet and phone purchases.

Debit cards usually also allow an instant withdrawal of cash, acting as an ATM card for this purpose. Merchants may also offer cashback facilities to customers so that they can withdraw cash along with their purchase. There are usually daily limits on the amount of cash that can be withdrawn. Most debit cards are plastic, but there are cards made of metal and, rarely, wood.

== Types of debit card systems ==
An example of the front of a typical debit card: 1. Issuing bank logo; 2. EMV chip; 3. Hologram (this is located on the back on some cards, including most Mastercard cards); 4. Card number (PAN) (may vary in length but mostly 16-digits with unique last 4 digits. However in cases such as Discover, Diner's Club, UnionPay and American Express it has a unique 15-digit card number); 5. Card brand logo; 6. Expiration date; 7. Cardholder's name; 8. EMV Contactless indicator

An example of the reverse side of a typical debit card: 1. Magnetic stripe; 2. Signature strip panel; 3. Card Security Code

There are currently three ways that debit card transactions are processed: EFTPOS (also known as online debit or PIN debit), offline debit (also known as signature debit), and the Electronic Purse Card System. One physical card can include the functions of all three types, so it can be used in a number of different circumstances. The five major debit card networks are UnionPay, American Express, Discover, Mastercard, and Visa. Other card networks are STAR, JCB, Pulse, etc. There are many types of debit cards, each accepted only within a particular country or region; for example, Switch (since merged with Maestro) and Solo in the United Kingdom; Interac in Canada; Carte Bleue in France; EC electronic cash (formerly Eurocheque) in Germany; Bancomat/PagoBancomat in Italy; UnionPay in China; RuPay in India; and EFTPOS cards in Australia and New Zealand. The need for cross-border compatibility and the advent of the euro recently led to many of these card networks (such as Switzerland's "EC direkt", Austria's "Bankomatkasse", and Switch in the United Kingdom) being re-branded with the internationally recognized Maestro logo, which is part of the Mastercard brand. Some debit cards are dual-branded with the logo of the (former) national card as well as Maestro (for example, EC cards in Germany, Switch and Solo in the UK, Pinpas cards in the Netherlands, Bancontact cards in Belgium, etc.). The use of a debit card system allows operators to package their products more effectively while monitoring customer spending.

=== Online debit system ===
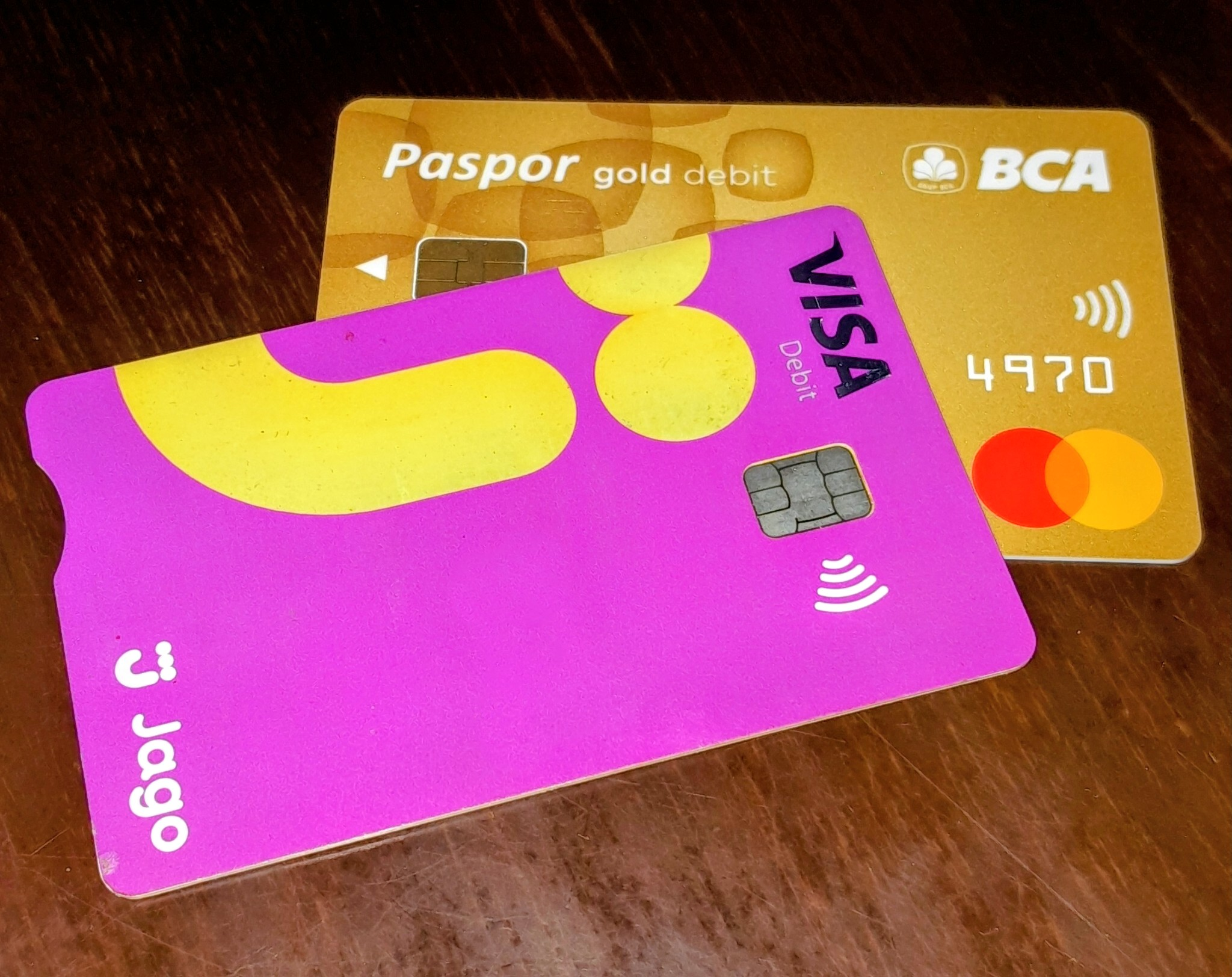
Two major card networks of debit card are Visa Debit and Debit Mastercard

Online debit cards require electronic authorization of every transaction, and the debits are reflected in the user's account immediately. The transaction may be additionally secured with the personal identification number (PIN) authentication system; some online cards require such authentication for every transaction, essentially becoming enhanced automatic teller machine (ATM) cards.

One difficulty with using online debit cards is the necessity of an electronic authorization device at the point of sale (POS) and sometimes also a separate PINpad to enter the PIN, although this is becoming commonplace for all card transactions in many countries.

Overall, the online debit card is generally viewed as superior to the offline debit card because of its more secure authentication system and live status, which alleviates problems with processing lag on transactions that may only issue online debit cards. Some online debit systems are using the normal authentication processes of Internet banking to provide real-time online debit transactions.

=== Offline debit system ===
Offline debit cards have the logos of major debit cards (for example, Visa or Mastercard). These cards connect straight to a person's bank account, but there is a delay before the money is taken out.

=== Electronic purse card system ===
Smart-card-based electronic purse systems (in which value is stored on the card chip, not in an externally recorded account, so that machines accepting the card need no network connectivity) have been in use throughout Europe since the mid-1990s, most notably in Germany (Geldkarte), Austria (Quick Wertkarte), the Netherlands (Chipknip), Belgium (Proton), Switzerland (CASH), and France (Moneo, which is usually carried by a debit card). In Austria and Germany, almost all current bank cards now include electronic purses, whereas the electronic purse has been recently phased out in the Netherlands.

=== Prepaid debit cards ===
==== Nomenclature ====
Prepaid debit cards are reloadable and can also be called reloadable or rechargeable debit cards.

==== Users ====
The primary market for prepaid debit cards has historically been unbanked people; that is, people who do not use banks or credit unions for their financial transactions.

In recent years, online payment fraud has surged dramatically. Consumers frequently face account takeovers, phishing attacks, and data breaches at merchants where they use their standard bank or credit cards. Beyond these threats, the European Union has introduced stricter regulations on how and where citizens can spend their money; a move many interpret as an infringement on privacy. To safeguard their real bank and credit card details, people are increasingly turning to disposable debit cards.

==== Advantages ====
Advantages of prepaid debit cards include being safer than carrying cash, worldwide acceptance, not having to worry about paying a credit card bill or going into debt, the opportunity for anyone over the age of 18 to apply and be accepted without checks on creditworthiness, and the option to deposit paychecks and government benefits directly onto the card for free. A newer advantage is the use of EMV technology and even contactless functionality, which had previously been limited to bank debit cards and credit cards.

==== Risks ====
- If the card provider offers an insecure website for the cardholder to check the balance on the card, this could give an attacker access to the card information.
- If the user loses the card and has not somehow registered it, they will likely lose the money.
- If a provider has technical issues, the money might not be accessible when a user needs it. Some companies' payment systems do not appear to accept prepaid debit cards.

==== Types ====
Prepaid cards vary by the issuer company: key and niche financial players (sometimes collaborations between businesses); purpose of usage (transit card, beauty gift cards, travel card, health savings card, business, insurance, etc.); and regions.

==== Governments ====
As of 2013, several city governments (including Oakland, California, and Chicago, Illinois) are now offering prepaid debit cards, either as part of a municipal ID card (for people such as undocumented immigrants who are unable to obtain a state driver's license or DMV ID card) in the case of Oakland or in conjunction with a prepaid transit pass (in Chicago). These cards have been heavily criticized for their higher-than-average fees, such as excessive flat fees added onto every purchase made with the card.

The U.S. federal government uses prepaid debit cards to make benefit payments to people who do not have bank accounts.

In July 2013, the Association of Government Accountants released a report on government use of prepaid cards, concluding that such programs offer a number of advantages to governments and those who receive payments on a prepaid card rather than by check. The prepaid card programs benefit payments largely for the cost savings they offer and provide easier access to cash for recipients, as well as increased security. The report also advises that governments should consider replacing any remaining cheque-based payments with prepaid card programs in order to realize substantial savings for taxpayers as well as benefits for payees.

==== Impact of government-mandated fee-free bank accounts ====
In January 2016, the UK government introduced a requirement for banks to offer fee-free basic bank accounts for all, which had a significant impact on the prepaid industry, including the departure of a number of firms.

== Consumer protection ==
Consumer protections vary depending on the network used. Visa and Mastercard, for instance, prohibit minimum and maximum purchase sizes, surcharges, and arbitrary security procedures on the part of merchants. Merchants are usually charged higher transaction fees for credit transactions since debit network transactions are less likely to be fraudulent. This may lead them to "steer" customers toward debit transactions. Consumers disputing charges may find it easier to do so with a credit card since the money will not immediately leave their control. Fraudulent charges on a debit card can also cause problems with a checking account because the money is withdrawn immediately and may thus result in an overdraft or bounced checks. In some cases, debit card-issuing banks will promptly refund any disputed charges until the matter can be settled, and in some jurisdictions, the consumer's liability for unauthorized charges is the same for both debit and credit cards.

In 2010, Bank of America announced that "it was doing away with overdraft fees for debit card purchases."

In some countries, such as India and Sweden, consumer protection is the same regardless of the network used. Some banks set minimum and maximum purchase sizes, mostly for online-only cards. However, this has nothing to do with the card networks but rather with the bank's judgment of the person's age and credit records. Any fees that the customers have to pay to the bank are the same regardless of whether the transaction is conducted as a credit or debit transaction, so there is no advantage for the customers to choose one transaction mode over another. Shops may add surcharges to the price of goods or services in accordance with laws allowing them to do so. Banks consider the purchases to have been made at the moment when the card was swiped, regardless of when the purchase settlement was made. Regardless of which transaction type was used, the purchase may result in an overdraft because the money is considered to have left the account at the moment of the card swipe.

According to Singapore's local financial and banking laws and regulations, all Singapore-issued credit and debit cards with Visa or Mastercard swipe magnet strips are disabled by default if used outside of Singapore. The whole idea is to prevent fraudulent activities and protect the card holder. If customers want to use card swipe magnet strips internationally, international card usage has to be enabled.

== Financial access ==
Debit cards and secured credit cards are popular among college students who have not yet established a credit history. Debit cards may also be used by expatriate workers to send money home to their families holding an affiliated debit card.

== Issues with deferred posting of offline debit ==
The consumer perceives a debit transaction as occurring in real time: the money is withdrawn from their account immediately after the authorization request from the merchant. In many countries, this is correct for online debit purchases. However, when a purchase is made using the "credit" (offline debit) option, the transaction merely places an authorization hold on the customer's account; funds are not actually withdrawn until the transaction is reconciled and hard-posted to the customer's account, usually a few days later. This is in contrast to a typical credit card transaction, in which, after a few days delay before the transaction is posted to the account, there is a further period of maybe a month before the consumer makes repayment.

Because of this, in the case of an error by the merchant or issuer, a debit transaction may cause more serious problems (for example, overdraft/money not accessible/overdrawn account) than a credit card transaction (for example, credit not accessible due to being over one's credit limit). This is especially true in the United States, where check fraud is a crime in every state but exceeding one's credit limit is not.

== Internet purchases ==
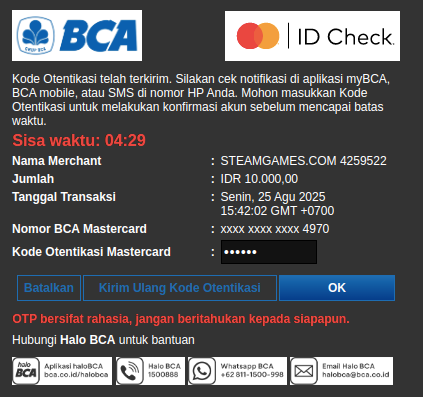
Debit card can be used for internet purchases, mostly with 3-D Secure

Debit cards may also be used on the Internet, either with or without using a PIN. Internet transactions may be conducted in either online or offline mode. Shops accepting online-only cards are rare in some countries (such as Sweden), while they are common in other countries (such as the Netherlands). For a comparison, PayPal offers the customer to use an online-only Maestro card if the customer enters a Dutch address of residence, but not if the same customer enters a Swedish address of residence.

Internet purchases can be authenticated by the consumer entering their PIN if the merchant has enabled a secure online PIN pad, in which case the transaction is conducted in debit mode. Otherwise, transactions may be conducted in either credit or debit mode (which is sometimes, but not always, indicated on the receipt), and this has nothing to do with whether the transaction was conducted in online or offline mode, since both credit and debit transactions may be conducted in both modes.

== Debit cards around the world ==
In some countries, banks tend to levy a small fee for each debit card transaction. In other countries (for example, New Zealand and the UK) the merchants bear all the costs and customers are not charged. There are many people who routinely use debit cards for all transactions, no matter how small. Some (small) retailers refuse to accept debit cards for small transactions, where paying the transaction fee would absorb the profit margin on the sale, making the transaction uneconomic for the retailer.

Some businesses do not accept card payments at all, even in an era with declining use of cash. This still happens for a variety of reasons, tax evasion by small business included.

In 2019, £35,000 million in tax revenue was lost in the United Kingdom due to cash-only payments. Many businesses such as barber shops, fish & chip shops, Chinese takeaways, the black market, and even some building sites are known for cash-in-hand payments in the UK, meaning high amounts of money can be unaccounted for.

=== Angola ===
The banks in Angola issue by official regulation only one brand of debit cards: Multicaixa, which is also the brand name of the one and only network of ATMs and POS terminals.

=== Armenia ===
ArCa (Armenian Card), a national system of debit (ArCa Debit and ArCa Classic) and credit (ArCa Gold, ArCa Business, ArCA Platinum, ArCa Affinity and ArCa Co-branded) cards popular in Armenia. Established in 2000 by 17 largest Armenian banks.

=== Australia ===
Debit cards in Australia are called different names depending on the issuing bank: Commonwealth Bank of Australia: Keycard; Westpac Banking Corporation: Handycard; National Australia Bank: FlexiCard; ANZ Bank: Access card; Bendigo Bank: Easy Money card.

A payment in Australia using a debit card can be processed by the local proprietary interbank network called EFTPOS, which is very popular and has been operating there since the 1980s, or it could be processed via an international Card scheme network (ie Visa, Mastercard). Debit cards that were solely EFTPOS-enabled can only be used domestically within Australia and would not be accepted internationally due to the absence of other scheme networks.

EFTPOS cards can also be used to deposit and withdraw cash over the counter at Australia Post outlets participating in Giro Post and withdrawals without purchase from certain major retailers, just as if the transaction was conducted at a bank branch, even if the bank branch is closed. Electronic transactions in Australia are generally processed via the Telstra Argent and Optus Transact Plus network—which has recently superseded the old Transcend network in the last few years. Most early keycards were only usable for EFTPOS and at ATM or bank branches, whilst the new debit card system works in the same way as a credit card, except it will only use funds in the specified bank account. This means that, among other advantages, the new system is suitable for electronic purchases without a delay of two to four days for bank-to-bank money transfers.

Australia operates both electronic credit card transaction authorization and traditional EFTPOS debit card authorization systems, the difference between the two being that EFTPOS transactions are authorized by a personal identification number (PIN) while credit card transactions can additionally be authorized using a contactless payment mechanism (requiring a PIN for purchases over $200). If the user fails to enter the correct pin three times, the consequences range from the card being locked out for a minimum 24-hour period, a phone call or trip to the branch to reactivate with a new PIN, the card being cut up by the merchant, or in the case of an ATM, being kept inside the machine, both of which require a new card to be ordered.

Generally credit card transaction costs are borne by the merchant with no fee applied to the end user (although a direct consumer surcharge of 0.5–3% is not uncommon) while EFTPOS transactions cost the consumer an applicable withdrawal fee charged by their bank.

The introduction of Visa and Mastercard debit cards along with regulation in the settlement fees charged by the operators of both EFTPOS and credit cards by the Reserve Bank has seen a continuation in the increasing ubiquity of credit card use among Australians and a general decline in the profile of EFTPOS. However, the regulation of settlement fees also removed the ability of banks, who typically provide merchant services to retailers on behalf of Visa or Mastercard, from stopping those retailers charging extra fees to take payment by credit card instead of cash or EFTPOS.

=== Bahrain ===
In Bahrain debit cards are under Benefit, the interbanking network for Bahrain. Benefit is also accepted in other countries though, mainly GCC, similar to the Saudi Payments Network and the Kuwaiti KNET.

=== Bangladesh ===
Bangladesh launched its first domestic card scheme, "TakaPay", on 1 November 2023. Until now banks were dependent on international card schemes such as Visa, Mastercard, UnionPay etc. From the launching day 3 banks are issuing "TakaPay" cards. The settlements are done through National Payment Switch Bangladesh. Those banks are: Sonali Bank PLC, BRAC Bank PLC and The City Bank Limited. 5 banks (Dutch Bangla Bank Limited, Eastern Bank PLC, Islami Bank Bangladesh PLC, Mutual Trust Bank Limited and United Commercial Bank PLC) have joined the scheme and will start issuing cards soon. Bangladesh Bank is working to bring all Bank, Mobile financial service provider and other financial institutions into the scheme.

As of December 2024, the initiative has seen slow uptake as only Tk 189 crore out of 50,289 crore or less than half a percent of card based transactions that month had been conducted through the platform.

=== Belgium ===
In Belgium, debit cards are widely accepted in most businesses, as well as in most hotels and restaurants. Businesses have to provide at least one electronic option for payment by law. Smaller restaurants or retailers sometimes choose to only accept Payconiq. Payconiq is a system that allows holders of a Belgian bank account to make payments by scanning a QR-code with their smartphone. Wero (payment) is planned to replace Payconiq in the future, and will also be available to non-belgians. Credit cards are less common, but acceptance has grown in recent years. All Belgian banks provide debit cards when you open a bank account. Usually, it is free to use debit cards on national and EU ATMs even if they aren't owned by the issuing bank. Since 2019, a few banks charge a 50ct cost when using ATMs who are not owned by the issuing bank. The debit cards in Belgium are branded with the logo of the national Bancontact system and also with an international debit system. Bancontact cards used to be commonly co-branded with Maestro, but banks have been transitioning to Bancontact cards co-branded with either Debit Mastercard or Visa Debit.

Payments within Belgium with Belgian debit cards are usually done with Bancontact, but almost all payment terminals are set up to also accept Mastercard, Visa, Maestro and V-pay if Bancontact is not available. Other international card networks like Discover and American Express have limited acceptance in Belgium.

Some banks also offer Visa and Mastercard debit cards without Bancontact functionality, but these are mostly online banks.

=== Brazil ===
In Brazil debit cards are called cartão de débito (singular) or cartões de débito (plural) and became popular in 2008. In 2013, the 100 millionth Brazilian debit card was issued. Debit cards replaced cheques, common until the 2000s.

Today, the majority of the financial transactions (like buying food at a supermarket), are made using debit cards (and this system is quickly replacing cash payments in Brazil). Nowadays, the majority of debit card payments are processed using a card + PIN combination, and almost every card comes with a NFC chip to make transactions.

The major debit card flags in Brazil are Visa (with Electron cards), Mastercard (with Maestro cards), and Elo.

The tap to pay technology is popular amongst the Brazilian public.

Something that appeared recently is a virtual card by some banks (such as Itaú, Bradesco, Mercado Pago and Nubank) on your internet banking platform. They give you a card number, expiration date and the CVV code to be used online. They also have a temporary virtual card number that works just in 48 hours, according to Itaú, you can use it to buy on unknown websites for safety reasons, because in the case of a data leak, the credit card number that was leaked wouldn't work.

=== Bulgaria ===
In Bulgaria, debit cards are accepted in almost all stores and shops, as well as in most of the hotels and restaurants in the bigger cities. Smaller restaurants or small shops often accept cash only. All Bulgarian banks can provide debit cards when you open a bank account, for maintenance costs. The most common cards in Bulgaria are contactless (and Chip&PIN or Magnetic stripe and PIN) with the brands of Debit Mastercard and Visa Debit (the most common were Maestro and Visa Electron some years ago). All POS terminals and ATMs accept Visa, Visa Electron, Visa Debit, VPay, Mastercard, Debit Mastercard, Maestro and Bcard. Also some POS terminals and ATMs accept Discover, American Express, Diners Club, JCB and UnionPay. Almost all POS terminals in Bulgaria support contactless payments. Credit cards are also common in Bulgaria. Paying with smartphones/smartwatches at POS terminals is also getting common.

=== Canada ===
Canada has a nationwide EFTPOS system, called Interac Direct Payment (IDP). Since being introduced in 1994, IDP has become the most popular payment method in the country. Previously, debit cards have been in use for ABM usage since the late 1970s, with credit unions in Saskatchewan and Alberta introducing the first card-based, networked ATMs beginning in June 1977. Debit cards, which could be used anywhere a credit card was accepted, were first introduced in Canada by Saskatchewan Credit Unions in 1982. In the early 1990s, pilot projects were conducted among Canada's six largest banks to gauge security, accuracy and feasibility of the Interac system. Slowly in the later half of the 1990s, it was estimated that approximately 50% of retailers offered Interac as a source of payment. Retailers, many small transaction retailers like coffee shops, resisted offering IDP to promote faster service. In 2009, 99% of retailers offer IDP as an alternative payment form.

In Canada, the debit card is sometimes referred to as a "bank card". It is a client card issued by a bank that provides access to funds and other bank account transactions, such as transferring funds, checking balances, paying bills, etc., as well as point of purchase transactions connected on the Interac network. Since its national launch in 1994, Interac Direct Payment has become so widespread that, as of 2001, more transactions in Canada were completed using debit cards than cash. This popularity may be partially attributable to two main factors: the convenience of not having to carry cash, and the availability of automated bank machines (ABMs) and direct payment merchants on the network. Debit cards may be considered similar to stored-value cards in that they represent a finite amount of money owed by the card issuer to the holder. They are different in that stored-value cards are generally anonymous and are only usable at the issuer, while debit cards are generally associated with an individual's bank account and can be used anywhere on the Interac network.

In Canada, the bank cards can be used at POS and ATMs. Interac Online has also been introduced in recent years allowing clients of most major Canadian banks to use their debit cards for online payment with certain merchants as well. Certain financial institutions also allow their clients to use their debit cards in the United States on the NYCE network. Several Canadian financial institutions that primarily offer VISA credit cards, including CIBC, RBC, Scotiabank, and TD, also issue a Visa Debit card in addition to their Interac debit card, either through dual-network co-branded cards (CIBC, Scotia, and TD), or as a "virtual" card used alongside the customer's existing Interac debit card (RBC). This allows for customer to use Interlink for online, over-the-phone, and international transactions and Plus for international ATMs, since Interac isn't well supported in these situations.

==== Consumer protection in Canada ====
Consumers in Canada are protected under a voluntary code entered into by all providers of debit card services, The Canadian Code of Practice for Consumer Debit Card Services (sometimes called the "Debit Card Code"). Adherence to the Code is overseen by the Financial Consumer Agency of Canada (FCAC), which investigates consumer complaints.

According to the FCAC website, revisions to the code that came into effect in 2005 put the onus on the financial institution to prove that a consumer was responsible for a disputed transaction, and also place a limit on the number of days that an account can be frozen during the financial institution's investigation of a transaction.

=== Chile ===
Chile has an EFTPOS system called Redcompra (Purchase Network) which is currently used in at least 23,000 establishments throughout the country. Goods may be purchased using this system at most supermarkets, retail stores, pubs and restaurants in major urban centers. Chilean banks issue Maestro, Visa Electron and Visa Debit cards.

=== Colombia ===
Colombia has a system called Redeban-Multicolor and Credibanco Visa which are currently used in at least 23,000 establishments throughout the country. Goods may be purchased using this system at most supermarkets, retail stores, pubs and restaurants in major urban centers. Colombian debit cards are Maestro (pin), Visa Electron (pin), Visa Debit (as credit) and Mastercard-Debit (as credit).

=== Denmark ===
The Danish debit card Dankort is ubiquitous in Denmark. It was introduced on 1 September 1983, and despite the initial transactions being paper-based, the Dankort quickly won widespread acceptance. By 1985 the first EFTPOS terminals were introduced, and 1985 was also the year when the number of Dankort transactions first exceeded 1 million. Today Dankort is primarily issued as a Multicard combining the national Dankort with the more internationally recognized Visa (denoted simply as a "Visa/Dankort" card). In September 2008, 4 million cards had been issued, of which three million cards were Visa/Dankort cards. It is also possible to get a Visa Electron debit card and Mastercard.

- In 2007, PBS (now called Nets), the Danish operator of the Dankort system, processed a total of 737 million Dankort transactions. Of these, 4.5 million were processed on just a single day, 21 December. This remains the current record.
- At the end of 2007, there were 3.9 million Dankort cards in existence.
- As of 2012, more than 80,000 Danish shops had a Dankort terminal, and another 11,000 internet shops also accepted the Dankort.

=== Finland ===
Most daily customer transactions are carried out with debit cards or online giro/electronic bill payment, although credit cards and cash are accepted. Checks are no longer used. Prior to European standardization, Finland had a national standard (pankkikortti = "bank card"). Physically, a pankkikortti was the same as an international credit card, and the same card imprinters and slips were used for pankkikortti and credit cards, but the cards were not accepted abroad. This has now been replaced by the Visa and Mastercard debit card systems, and Finnish cards can be used elsewhere in the European Union and the world.

An electronic purse system, with a chipped card, was introduced, but did not gain much traction.

Signing a payment offline entails incurring debt, thus offline payment is not available to minors. However, online transactions are permitted, and since almost all stores have electronic terminals, today also minors can use debit cards. Previously, only cash withdrawal from ATMs was available to minors (automaattikortti (ATM card) or Visa Electron).

=== France ===
Carte Bancaire (CB), the national payment scheme, in 2008, had 57.5 million cards carrying its logo and 7.76 billion transactions (POS and ATM) were processed through the e-rsb network (135 transactions per card mostly debit or deferred debit). In 2019, Carte Bancaire had 71.1 million cards carrying its logo and 13.76 billion transactions (POS and ATM) were processed through its network. Most CB cards are debit cards, either debit or deferred debit. Less than 10% of CB cards were credit cards.

Banks in France usually charge annual fees for debit cards (despite card payments being very cost efficient for the banks), yet they do not charge personal customers for chequebooks or processing checks (despite cheques being very costly for the banks). This imbalance dates from the unilateral introduction in France of Chip and PIN debit cards in the early 1990s, when the cost of this technology was much higher than it is now. Credit cards of the type found in the United Kingdom and United States are unusual in France and the closest equivalent is the deferred debit card, which operates like a normal debit card, except that all purchase transactions are postponed until the end of the month, thereby giving the customer between 1 and 31 days of "interest-free" credit. Banks can charge more for a deferred debit card.

Most France debit cards are branded with the CB logo, which assures acceptance throughout France. Most banks now issue Visa or Mastercard co-branded cards, so that the card is accepted on both the CB and the Visa or Mastercard networks.

In France payment cards are commonly called Carte Bleue ("blue card") regardless of their actual brand. Carte Bleue was a card brand acquired in 2010 by Visa which is not used anymore. Until its purchase the main characteristic of Carte Bleue was to benefit from its alliance with Visa which allowed the use of the cards on both networks.

Many smaller merchants in France refuse to accept debit cards for transactions under a certain amount because of the minimum fee charged by merchants' banks per transaction. But more and more merchants accept debit cards for small amounts, due to the increased use of debit cards. Merchants in France do not differentiate between debit and credit cards, and so both have equal acceptance. It is legal in France to set a minimum amount to transactions, but the merchants must display it clearly.

In January 2016, 57.2% of all the debit cards in France also had a contactless payment chip. The maximum amount per transaction was originally set to €20 and the maximum amount of all contactless payments per day is between €50-100 depending on the bank. The per-transaction limit increased to €30 in October 2017. Due to the COVID-19 pandemic, the per-transaction limit increased to €50 in May 2020 to comply with demands from the French government and the European Banking Authority.

==== Liability and e-cards ====
According to French law, banks are liable for any transaction made with a copy of the original card and for any transaction made without a card (on the phone or on the Internet), so banks have to pay back any fraudulent transaction to the card holder if the previous criteria are met. Fighting card fraud is therefore more interesting for banks. As a consequence, French banks websites usually propose an "e-card" service ("electronic (bank) card"), where a new virtual card is created and linked to a physical card. Such virtual card can be used only once and for the maximum amount given by the card holder. If the virtual card number is intercepted or used to try to get a higher amount than expected, the transaction is blocked.

=== Germany ===
Germany has a dedicated debit card payment system called girocard which is usually co-branded with V Pay or Maestro depending on the issuing bank. In recent years both Visa Debit and Mastercard Debit cards are increasingly more common as well.

Historically, facilities already existed before EFTPOS became popular with the Eurocheque card, an authorization system initially developed for paper checks where, in addition to signing the actual check, customers also needed to show the card alongside the check as a security measure. Those cards could also be used at ATMs and for card-based electronic funds transfer with PIN entry. These are now the only functions of such cards: the Eurocheque system (along with the brand) was abandoned in 2002 during the transition from the Deutsche Mark to the euro. As of 2005, most stores and petrol outlets have EFTPOS facilities. Processing fees are paid by the businesses, which leads to some business owners refusing debit card payments for sales totalling less than a certain amount, usually 5 or 10 euro.

To avoid the processing fees, many businesses resorted to using direct debit, which is then called electronic direct debit (German: Elektronisches Lastschriftverfahren, abbr. ELV). The point-of-sale terminal reads the bank sort code and account number from the card but instead of handling the transaction through the Girocard network it simply prints a form, which the customer signs to authorise the debit note. However, this method also avoids any verification or payment guarantee provided by the network. Further, customers can return debit notes by notifying their bank without giving a reason. This means that the beneficiary bears the risk of fraud and illiquidity. Some business mitigate the risk by consulting a proprietary blacklist or by switching to Girocard for higher transaction amounts.

Around 2000, an Electronic Purse Card was introduced, dubbed Geldkarte ("money card"). It makes use of the smart card chip on the front of the standard issue debit card. This chip can be charged with up to 200 euro, and is advertised as a means of making medium to very small payments, even down to several euros or cent payments. The key factor here is that no processing fees are deducted by banks. It did not gain the popularity its inventors had hoped for. As of 2020, several partners pulled out of accepting the Geldkarte which is no longer issued and set to be retired altogether in the near future.

=== Guinée Bissau ===
See "UEMOA".

=== Greece ===
Debit card usage surged in Greece after the introduction of Capital Controls in 2015.

=== Hong Kong ===
Most bank cards in Hong Kong for saving / current accounts are equipped with EPS and UnionPay, which function as a debit card and can be used at merchants for purchases, where funds are withdrawn from the associated account immediately.

EPS is a Hong Kong only system and is widely accepted in merchants and government departments. However, as UnionPay cards are accepted more widely overseas, consumers can use the UnionPay functionality of the bank card to make purchases directly from the bank account.

Visa debit cards are uncommon in Hong Kong. The British banking firm HSBC's subsidiary Hang Seng Bank's Enjoy card and American firm Citibank's ATM Visa are two of the Visa debit cards available in Hong Kong.

Debit cards usage in Hong Kong is relatively low, as the credit card penetration rate is high in Hong Kong. In Q1 2017, there are near 20 million credit cards in circulation, about 3 times the adult population. There are 145,800 thousand transaction made by credit cards but only 34,001 thousand transactions made by debit cards.

=== Hungary ===
In Hungary debit cards are far more common and popular than credit cards. In the late 90s and early 2000s many Hungarians even referred to their embossed debit cards ("dombornyomott betéti kártya") mistakenly using the word for credit card ("hitelkártya"). The most commonly used phrase today, however, is simply bank card ("bankkártya") or card ("kártya").

=== India ===
After the December 2016 demonetization by the government, there has been a surge in cashless transactions, so nowadays you could find card acceptance in most places. The debit card was mostly used for ATM transactions. RBI has announced that fees are not justified so transactions have no processing fees. Almost half of Indian debit and credit card users use Rupay card. Some Indian banks issue Visa debit cards, though some banks (like SBI and Citibank India) also issue Maestro cards. The debit card transactions are routed through Rupay (mostly), Visa or Mastercard networks in India and overseas rather than directly via the issuing bank.

The National Payments Corporation of India (NPCI) launched a new card processing platform called RuPay, similar to Singapore's NETS and Mainland China's UnionPay, as an alternative to Visa and Mastercard, it is widely accepted, but due to the popularisation of Unified Payments Interface (UPI), most people connect their bank accounts directly to a UPI provider to access mobile payments, cutting out the need for a debit card.

As the COVID cases in India are surging up, the banking institution has shifted its focus to contactless payment options such as contactless debit card, contactless credit card and contactless prepaid card. The payment methods are changing drastically in India because of social distancing norms and lockdown; people are using more of the digital transactions rather than cash.

=== Indonesia ===
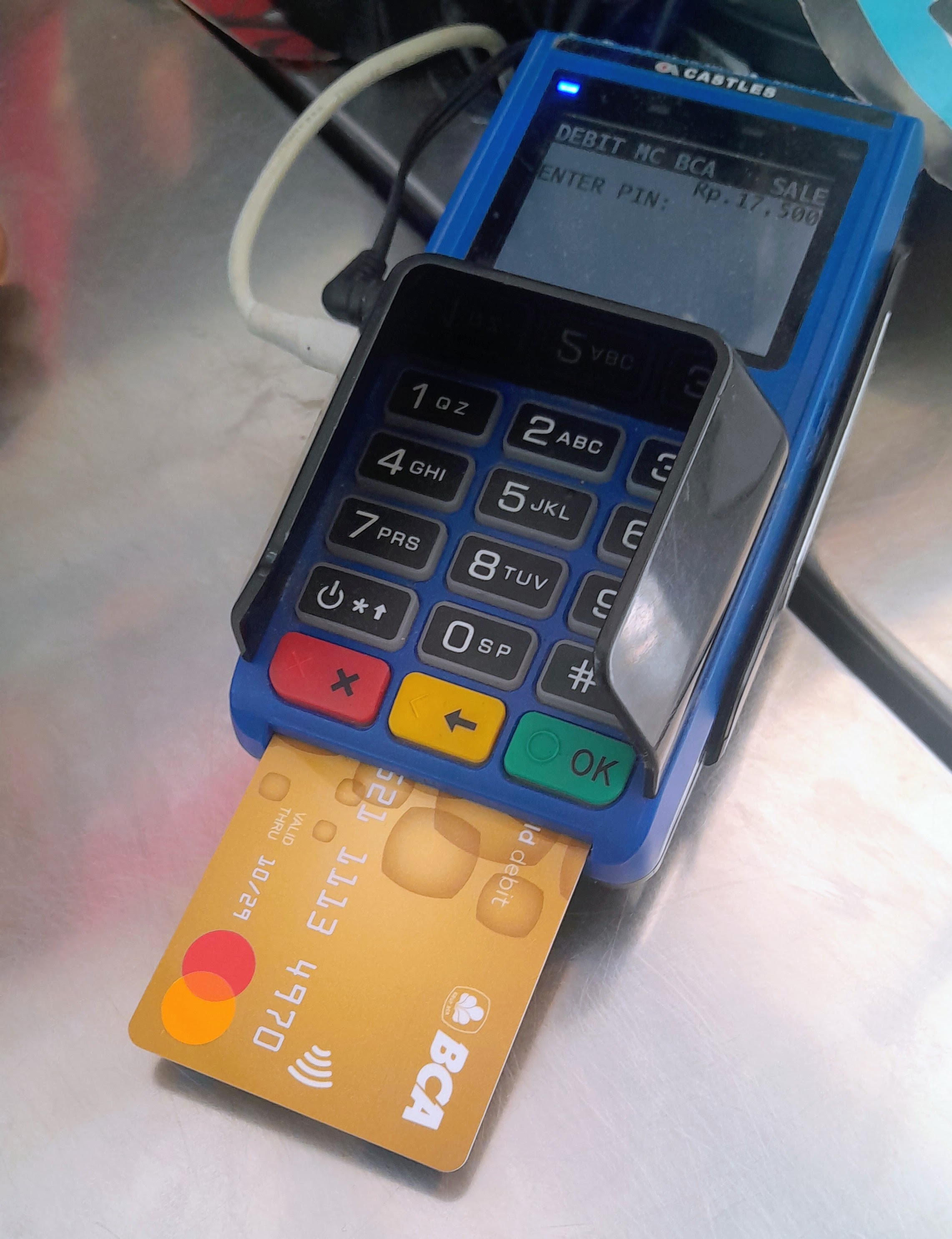
Castles Technology payment terminal with BCA Debit Mastercard card inserted

In Indonesia, most banks issued debit card with support for international schemes such as Visa Debit (previously also Visa Electron before its discontinuation), Debit Mastercard (including Maestro), and MEPS. National debit card scheme in Indonesia is Gerbang Pembayaran Nasional (GPN; National Payment Gateway) which incorporating existing national bank schemes such as Debit BCA (and its Prima interbank network's counterpart, Prima Debit) and Mandiri Debit. It is mandatory for customers to have at least one GPN card for domestic offline transactions.

Contactless payment schemes (such as Visa Contactless and Mastercard Contactless) are integrated into newer debit card but national QR code payment system QRIS (based on EMVCo QR code standard) is more popular among consumers and small and medium enterprises. Growth of QRIS also impacted debit card transaction in general. Nevertheless, international contactless payment scheme providers and their banks partners are still promoting the technology, touting its usability overseas.

=== Iraq ===
Iraq's two biggest state-owned banks, Rafidain Bank and Rasheed Bank, together with the Iraqi Electronic Payment System (IEPS) have established a company called International Smart Card, which has developed a national card network called 'Qi Card', which they have issued since 2008.

=== Ireland ===
==== Current system (as of December 2022) ====
In Ireland, all debits cards are exclusively Chip and PIN. The market is dominated by Visa Debit cards - the "Top 3" banks in Ireland: Allied Irish Banks, Bank of Ireland and Permanent TSB all use Visa Debit, as well as the exiting bank Ulster Bank. Other financial institutions that maintain a minority stake such as EBS, An Post Money and some credit unions use Mastercard Debit cards, as well as the exiting bank KBC. Revolut, with over 2 million customers in Ireland, varies between Mastercard and Visa Debit cards.

Irish debit cards are normally multi-functional and combine ATM card facilities. Some banks will provide ATM cards to vulnerable or elderly customers, but only on request. The practice is rare and it is on a case-by-case basis.

For online purchases, the cards are used together with the bank's mobile app for Strong Customer Authentication as required by the EU's Payment Services Directive (PSD2).

Most Irish debit cards are also enabled for contactless payment for purchases €50 or below, and display the contactless symbol. The limit was previously €30, but was increased to €50 as a result of the COVID-19 pandemic to increase card usage in order to minimize the handling of cash. Some banks, such as AIB, do not provide contactless cards to certain account holders, such as those under 18. After 3-5 contactless transactions, the bank will ask the card user to enter their PIN through a Chip and PIN transaction for authentication.

Apple Pay and Google Pay are also embraced as contactless payment methods with many retailers as they use the same contactless technology. However, due to the device's authentication of the user, there is no limit on the purchase amount. In some cases, there are limits of a large amount such as €500, however this may be imposed by the retailer due to technical constraints rather than for security purposes.

The cards are usually processed online, but some cards can also be processed offline depending on the rules applied by the card issuer.

A number of card issuers also provide prepaid debit card accounts primarily for use as gift cards / vouchers or for added security and anonymity online, e.g. CleverCards. These may be disposable or reloadable and are predominately Mastercard branded. One4All vouchers, a popular voucher given particularly to employees by companies at Christmas time, are another type of a prepaid debit card used. However, it is limited to retailers that specifically opt-in to using One4All cards as a payment method and are neither Visa nor Mastercard branded.

==== Previous system (defunct since 28 February 2014) ====
Laser was launched by the Irish banks in 1996 as an extension of the existing ATM and Cheque guarantee card systems that had existed for many years. When the service was added, it became possible to make payments with a multifunctional card that combined ATM, cheque and debit card and international ATM facilities through Mastercard Cirrus or Visa Plus and sometimes the British Link ATM system. Their functionality was similar to the British Switch card.

The system first launched as a swipe & sign card and could be used in Ireland in much the same way as a credit card and were compatible standard card terminals (online or offline, although they were usually processed online). They could also be used in cardholder-not-present transactions over the phone, by mail or on the internet or for processing recurring payments. Laser also offered 'cash back' facilities where customers could ask retailers (where offered) for an amount of cash along with their transaction. This service allowed retailers to reduce volumes of cash in tills and allowed consumers to avoid having to use ATMs. Laser adopted EMV 'Chip and PIN' security in 2002 in common with other credit and debit cards right across Europe. In 2005, some banks issued customers with Lasers cards that were co-branded with Maestro. This allowed them to be used in POS terminals overseas, internet transactions were usually restricted to sites that specifically accepted Laser.

Since 2006, Irish banks have progressively replaced Laser with international schemes, primarily Visa Debit and by 28 February 2014 the Laser Card system had been withdrawn entirely and is no longer accepted by retailers.

=== Israel ===
The Israel bank card system is somewhat confusing to newcomers, comprising a blend of features taken from different types of cards. What may be referred to as a credit card, is most likely to be a deferred debit card on an associated bank current account, the most common type of card in Israel, somewhat like the situation in France, though the term "debit card" is not in common usage.

Cards are nearly universally called cartis ashrai (כרטיס אשראי), literally, "credit card", a term which may belie the card's characteristics. Its main feature may be a direct link to a connected bank account (through which they are mostly issued), with the total value of the transactions made on the card being debited from the bank account in full on a regular date once a month, without the option to carry the balance over; indeed certain types of transactions (such as online and/or foreign currency) may be debited directly from the connected bank account at the time of the transaction.

Any such limited credit enjoyed is a result of the customer's assets and credibility with the bank, and not granted by the credit card company. The card usually enables immediate ATM cash withdrawals & balance inquiries (as debit cards do), installment & deferred charge interest free transactions offered by merchants (also applicable in Brazil), interest bearing installment plans/deferred charge/revolving credit which is transaction specific at the point of sale (though granted by the issuer, hence the interest), and a variety of automated/upon request types of credit schemes including loans, some of which revolve or resemble the extended payment options sometimes offered by charge cards.

Thus the "true" debit card is not so common in Israel, though it has existed since 1994. It is offered by two credit companies in Israel: One is ICC, short for "Israel Credit Cards" (referred to as "CAL", an acronym formed from its abbreviation in Hebrew), which issues it in the form of a Visa Electron card valid only in Israel. It is offered mainly through the Israel Post (post office) bank (which is not allowed, by regulation, to offer any type of credit) or through Israel Discount Bank, its main owner (where it is branded as "Discount Money Key" card). This branded Israel Discount Bank branded debit card also offered as valid worldwide card, either as Visa Electron or Mastercard Debit cards.

The second & more common debit card is offered by the Isracard consortium to its affiliate banks and is branded "Direct". It is valid only in Israel, under its local private label brand, as "Isracard Direct" (which was known as "Electro Cheque" until 2002 and while the local brand Isracard is often viewed as a Mastercard for local use only). Since 2006, Isracard has also offered an international version, branded "Mastercard Direct", which is less common. These two debit card brands operate offline in Israel (meaning the transaction operates under the credit cards systems & debited officially from the cardholder account only few days later, after being processed—though reflected on the current account immediately). In 2014 the Isracard Direct card (a.k.a. the valid only in Israel version) was relaunched as Isracash, though the former subbrand still being marketed and replaced ICC Visa Electron as Israel Post bank debit card.

Overall, banks routinely offer deferred debit cards to their new customers, with "true" debit cards usually offered only to those who cannot obtain credit. These latter cards are not attractive to the average customer since they attract both a monthly fee from the credit company and a bank account fee for each day's debits. Isracard Direct is by far more common than the ICC Visa Electron debit card. Banks who issue mainly Visa cards will rather offer electronic use, mandate authorized transaction only, unembossed version of Visa Electron deferred debit cards (branded as "Visa Basic" or "Visa Classic") to its customers—sometimes even in the form of revolving credit card.

Credit/debit card transactions in Israel are not PIN based (other than at ATMs) and it is only in recent years that EMV chip smart cards have begun to be issued, with the Bank of Israel in 2013 ordering the banks and credit card companies to switch customers to credit cards with the EMV security standard within 3.5 years.

=== Italy ===
Debit cards are quite popular in Italy. There are both classic and prepaid cards. There are two Italian interbank networks, Bancomat and PagoBancomat: Bancomat is the commercial brand for the cash withdrawal circuit, while PagoBancomat is used for POS transactions. Nowadays many debit cards use Visa or Mastercard circuit, often in co-badging with Bancomat/PagoBancomat. There is another national circuit, Postamat, that is used by the debit and prepaid cards offered by the national post service, Poste Italiane, mainly for the cash withdrawal in the post-office ATM.

=== Japan ===
In Japan people usually use their cash cards (キャッシュカード, kyasshu kādo), originally intended only for use with cash machines, as debit cards. The debit functionality of these cards is usually referred to as J-Debit (ジェイデビット, Jeidebitto), and only cash cards from certain banks can be used. A cash card has the same size as a Visa/Mastercard. As identification, the user will have to enter their four-digit PIN when paying. J-Debit was started in Japan on 6 March 2000. However, J-Debit has not been that popular since then.

Suruga Bank began service of Japan's first Visa Debit in 2006. Rakuten Bank, formally known as Ebank, offers a Visa debit card.

Resona Bank and The Bank of Tokyo-Mitsubishi UFJ bank also offer a Visa branded debit card.

=== Kuwait ===
In Kuwait, all banks provide a debit card to their account holders. This card is branded as KNET, which is the central switch in Kuwait. KNET card transactions are free for both customer and the merchant and therefore KNET debit cards are used for low valued transactions as well. KNET cards are mostly co-branded as Maestro or Visa Electron which makes it possible to use the same card outside Kuwait on any terminal supporting these payment schemes.

=== Malaysia ===
In Malaysia, the local debit card network is operated by the Malaysian Electronic Clearing Corporation (MyClear), which had taken over the scheme from MEPS in 2008. The new name for the local debit card in Malaysia is MyDebit, which was previously known as either bankcard or e-debit. Debit cards in Malaysia are now issued on a combo basis where the card has both the local debit card payment application as well as having that of an International scheme (Visa or Mastercard). All newly issued MyDebit combo cards with Visa or Mastercard have the contactless payment feature. The same card also acts as the ATM card for cash withdrawals.

=== Mali ===
See "UEMOA".

=== Mexico ===
In Mexico, many companies use a type of debit card called a payroll card (tarjeta de nómina), in which they deposit their employee's payrolls, instead of paying them in cash or through checks. This method is preferred in many places because it is a much safer and secure alternative compared to the more traditional forms of payment.

=== Netherlands ===
In the Netherlands using EFTPOS is known as pinnen (pinning), a term derived from the use of a personal identification number (PIN). PINs are also used for ATM transactions, and the term is used interchangeably by many people, although it was introduced as a marketing brand for EFTPOS. The system was launched in 1987, and in 2010 there were 258,585 terminals throughout the country, including mobile terminals used by delivery services and on markets. All banks offer a debit card suitable for EFTPOS with current accounts.

PIN transactions are usually free to the customer, but the retailer is charged per-transaction and monthly fees. Equens, an association with all major banks as its members, runs the system, and until August 2005 also charged for it. Responding to allegations of monopoly abuse, it has handed over contractual responsibilities to its member banks through who now offer competing contracts. The system is organised through a special banking association Currence set up specifically to coordinate access to payment systems in The Netherlands. Interpay, a legal predecessor of Equens, was fined €47,000,000 in 2004, but the fine was later dropped, and a related fine for banks was lowered from €17 million to €14 million. Per-transaction fees are between 5–10 cts, depending on volume.

Credit card use in the Netherlands is very low, and most credit cards cannot be used with EFTPOS, or charge very high fees to the customer. Debit cards can often, though not always, be used in the entire EU for EFTPOS. Most debit cards are Mastercard Maestro cards. Visa's V Pay cards are also accepted at most locations. In 2011, spending money using debit cards rose to €83,000,000,000 whilst cash spending dropped to €51,000,000,000 and credit card spending grew to €5,000,000,000.

Electronic Purse Cards (called Chipknip) were introduced in 1996, but have never become very popular. The system was abolished at the end of 2014.

=== New Zealand ===
EFTPOS (electronic fund transfer at point of sale) in New Zealand was highly popular until other forms of payment began to take over in the 2010s. In 2006, 70 percent of all retail transactions were made by EFTPOS, with an average of 306 EFTPOS transactions being made per person. By 2023, this had declined to a little over 20%.

The system involves the merchant swiping (or inserting) the customer's card and entering the purchase amount. Point of sale systems with integrated EFTPOS often send the purchase total to the terminal and the customer swipes their own card. The customer then selects the account they wish to use: Current/Cheque (CHQ), Savings (SAV), or Credit Card (CRD), before entering in their PIN. After a short processing time in which the terminal contacts the EFTPOS network and the bank, the transaction is approved (or declined) and a receipt is printed. The EFTPOS system is used for credit cards as well, with a customer selecting Credit Card and entering their PIN.

Nearly all retail outlets have EFTPOS facilities, to the point that retailers without EFTPOS normally advertise 'cash only'. The main exceptions are small traders at farmers markets and other occasional outlets. Most mobile operators such as taxis, stall holders and pizza deliverers have mobile EFTPOS systems. The system is made up of two primary networks: EFTPOS NZ, which is owned by VeriFone and Worldline NZ, which is owned by ANZ Bank New Zealand, ASB Bank, Westpac and the Bank of New Zealand. The two networks are intertwined, highly sophisticated and secure, able to handle huge volumes of transactions during busy periods such as the lead-up to Christmas. Network failures are rare, but when they occur they cause massive disruption, major delays and loss of income for businesses. The CrowdStrike failure in July 2024 was one such incident.

Merchants and customers are not charged a fee for using EFTPOS - merchants only have to pay for the equipment rental.

One of the disadvantages of New Zealand's well-established EFTPOS system is that it is incompatible with overseas systems and non-face-to-face purchases. In response to this, many banks since 2005 have introduced international debit cards such as Maestro and Visa Debit which work online and overseas as well as on the New Zealand EFTPOS system.

=== Nigeria ===
Many Nigerians regard Debit cards as ATM cards because of its features to withdraw money directly from the ATM.

According to the Central Bank of Nigeria, Debit Cards can be issued to customers having Savings /Current Accounts. There are three major types of Debit card in Nigeria: Mastercard, Verve, and Visa card. These Debit cards companies have other packages they offer in Nigeria like Naira Mastercard platinum, Visa Debit (Dual currency), GTCrea8 Card, SKS Teen Card, etc. All the packages depend on your Bank.

=== Philippines ===
In the Philippines, all three national ATM network consortia offer proprietary PIN debit. This was first offered by Express Payment System in 1987, followed by Megalink with Paylink in 1993 then BancNet with the Point-of-Sale in 1994.

Express Payment System or EPS was the pioneer provider, having launched the service in 1987 on behalf of the Bank of the Philippine Islands. The EPS service has subsequently been extended in late 2005 to include the other Expressnet members: Banco de Oro and Land Bank of the Philippines. They currently operate 10,000 terminals for their cardholders.

Megalink launched Paylink EFTPOS system in 1993. Terminal services are provided by Equitable Card Network on behalf of the consortium. Service is available in 2,000 terminals, mostly in Metro Manila.

BancNet introduced their point of sale system in 1994 as the first consortium-operated EFTPOS service in the country. The service is available in over 1,400 locations throughout the Philippines, including second and third-class municipalities. In 2005, BancNet signed a Memorandum of Agreement to serve as the local gateway for China UnionPay, the sole ATM switch in China. This will allow the estimated 1.0 billion Chinese ATM cardholders to use the BancNet ATMs and the EFTPOS in all participating merchants.

Visa debit cards are issued by Union Bank of the Philippines (e-Wallet & eon), Chinatrust, Equicom Savings Bank (Key Card & Cash Card), Banco de Oro, HSBC, HSBC Savings Bank, Sterling Bank of Asia (Visa ShopNPay prepaid and debit cards) and EastWest Bank. Union Bank of the Philippines cards, EastWest Visa Debit Card, Equicom Savings Bank & Sterling Bank of Asia EMV cards which can also be used for internet purchases. Sterling Bank of Asia has released its first line of prepaid and debit Visa cards with EMV chip.

Mastercard debit cards are issued by Banco de Oro, Security Bank (Cashlink & Cash Card) and Smart Communications (Smart Money) tied up with Banco de Oro. Mastercard Electronic cards are issued by BPI (Express Cash) and Security Bank (CashLink Plus).

Originally, all Visa and Mastercard based debit cards in the Philippines are non-embossed and are marked either for "Electronic Use Only" (Visa/Mastercard) or "Valid only where Mastercard Electronic is Accepted" (Mastercard Electronic). However, EastWest Bank started to offer embossed Visa Debit Cards without the for "Electronic Use Only" mark. Paypass Debit Mastercard from other banks also have embossed labels without the for "Electronic Use Only" mark. Unlike credit cards issued by some banks, these Visa and Mastercard-branded debit cards do not feature EMV chips, hence they can only be read by the machines through swiping.

By 21 March 2016, BDO has started issuing sets of Debit Mastercards having the EMV chip and is the first Philippine bank to have it. This is a response to the BSP's monitor of the EMV shift progress in the country. By 2017, all Debit Cards in the country should have an EMV chip on it.

=== Poland ===
In Poland, the first system of electronic payments was operated by Orbis, which later was changed to PolCard in 1991 (which also issued its own cards) and then that system was bought by First Data Poland Holding SA. In the mid-1990s international brands such as Visa, Mastercard, and the unembossed Visa Electron or Maestro were introduced.

Visa Electron and Maestro work as standard debit cards: the transactions are debited instantly, although it may happen on some occasions that a transaction is processed with some delay (hours, up to one day). These cards do not possess the options that credit cards have.

In the late 2000s, contactless cards started to be introduced. The first technology to be used was Mastercard PayPass, later joined by Visa's payWave. This payment method is now universal and accepted almost everywhere. In an everyday use this payment method is always called Paypass. Almost all businesses in Poland accept debit and credit cards.

In the mid-2010s, Polish banks started to replace unembossed cards with embossed electronic cards such as Debit Mastercard and Visa Debit, allowing the customers to own a card that has all qualities of a credit card (given that credit cards are not popular in Poland).

There are also some banks that do not possess an identification system to allow customers to order debit cards online.

=== Portugal ===
In Portugal, debit cards are accepted almost everywhere: ATMs, stores, and so on. The most commonly accepted are Visa and Mastercard, or the unembossed Visa Electron or Maestro. Regarding Internet payments debit cards cannot be used for transfers, due to its unsafeness, so banks recommend the use of 'MBnet', a pre-registered safe system that creates a virtual card with a pre-selected credit limit. All the card system is regulated by SIBS, the institution created by Portuguese banks to manage all the regulations and communication processes properly. SIBS' shareholders are all the 27 banks operating in Portugal.

=== Russia ===
In addition to Visa, Mastercard and American Express, there are some local payment systems based in general on smart card technology.

- Sbercard. This payment system was created by Sberbank around 1995–1996. It uses BGS Smartcard Systems AG smart card technology that is, DUET. Sberbank was a single retail bank in the Soviet Union before 1990. De facto this is a payment system of the SberBank.
- Zolotaya Korona. This card brand was created in 1994. Zolotaya Korona is based on CFT technology.
- STB Card. This card uses the classic magnetic stripe technology. It almost fully collapsed after 1998 (GKO crisis) with STB bank failure.
- Union Card. The card also uses the classic magnetic stripe technology. This card brand is on the decline. These accounts are being reissued as Visa or Mastercard accounts.

Nearly every transaction, regardless of brand or system, is processed as an immediate debit transaction. Non-debit transactions within these systems have spending limits that are strictly limited when compared with typical Visa or Mastercard accounts.

=== Saudi Arabia ===
In Saudi Arabia, all debit card transactions are routed through Saudi Payments Network (mada), the only electronic payment system in the Kingdom and all banks are required by the Saudi Central Bank (SAMA) to issue cards fully compatible with the network. It connects all point of sale (POS) terminals throughout the country to a central payment switch which in turn re-routes the financial transactions to the card issuer, local bank, Visa, Amex or Mastercard.

As well as its use for debit cards, the network is also used for ATM and credit card transactions.

=== Serbia ===
All Serbian banks issue debit cards. Since August 2018, all owners of transactional accounts in Serbian dinars are automatically issued a debit card of the national brand DinaCard. Other brands (VISA, Mastercard and Maestro) are more popular, better accepted and more secure, but must be requested specifically as additional cards. Debit cards are used for cash withdrawal at ATMs as well as store transactions.

=== Singapore ===
Singapore's debit service is managed by the Network for Electronic Transfers (NETS), founded by Singapore's leading banks and shareholders namely DBS, Keppel Bank, OCBC and its associates, OUB, IBS, POSB, Tat Lee Bank and UOB in 1985 as a result of a need for a centralised e-Payment operator.

However, due to the banking restructuring and mergers, the local banks remaining were UOB, OCBC, DBS-POSB as the shareholders of NETS with Standard Chartered Bank to offer NETS to their customers. However, DBS and POSB customers can use their network ATMs on their own and not be shared with UOB, OCBC or SCB (StanChart). The mega failure of 5 July 2010 of POSB-DBS ATM Networks (about 97,000 machines) made the government to rethink the shared ATM system again as it affected the NETS system too.

In 2010, in line with the mandatory EMV system, Local Singapore Banks started to reissue their Debit Visa/Mastercard branded debit cards with EMV Chip compliant ones to replace the magnetic stripe system. Banks involved included NETS Members of POSB-DBS, UOB-OCBC-SCB along with the SharedATM alliance (NON-NETS) of HSBC, Citibank, State Bank of India, and Maybank. Standard Chartered Bank (SCB) is also a SharedATM alliance member. Basic ATM debit cards also utilise the EMV chip with the payment network’s logo usually on the back. (i.e the POSB ATM Card runs on the Mastercard Cirrus network.)

Maybank Debit Mastercards can be used in Malaysia just like a normal ATM or Debit MEPS card.

Singapore also uses the e-purse systems of NETS CASHCARD and the CEPAS wave system by EZ-Link and NETS.

=== South Korea ===
There are two kinds of debit cards are in South Korea; 'Debit card' Issued by bank, and 'Check card' Issued by card company. Debit cards are only accepted in debit networks such as Shinsegae and e-mart. Check cards are accepted in every stores accept credit cards. Korean debit cards do not accept offline Debit(credit) transactions domestically, so every transactions must made by real time.

=== Spain ===
Debit cards are accepted in a relatively large number of stores, both large and small, in Spain. Banks often offer debit cards for small fees in connection with a checking account. These cards are used more often than credit cards at ATMs because it is a cheaper alternative.

=== Sweden ===
Debit cards are common in Sweden as they are traditionally issued by your bank who in turn normally cooperates with either Visa Debit, Visa Electron, Debit Mastercard, or Mastercard Maestro. Thus, ATM's and stores in Sweden accept these debit cards if they accept card payments with only rare exceptions.

=== Switzerland ===
Until 2021, the most widespread debit card was the Maestro, which incurred maximum transaction fees. Banks began replacing these with Visa Debit and Debit Mastercard cards starting in 2021. This resulted in a decrease in fees charged by retailers for small purchases and a significant increase for purchases exceeding a few tens of Swiss francs. Intervention by the Competition Commission and the Price Surveillance Authority helped to limit this increase but not eliminate it. Overall, the commissions charged to retailers increased substantially.

=== Taiwan ===
Most banks issue major-brand debit cards that can be used internationally such as Visa, Mastercard and JCB, often with contactless functionality. Payments at brick-and-mortar stores generally require a signature except for contactless payments.

A separate, local debit system, known as Smart Pay, can be used by the majority of debit and ATM cards, even major-brand cards. This system is available only in Taiwan and a few locations in Japan as of 2016. Non-contactless payments require a PIN instead of a signature. Cards from a few banks support contactless payment with Smart Pay.

=== UAE ===
Debit cards are widely accepted from different debit card issuers including the Network International local subsidiary of Emirates Bank.

=== United Kingdom ===
In the UK debit cards (an integrated EFTPOS system) are an established part of the retail market and are widely accepted by both physical and internet stores. The term EFTPOS is not widely used by the public; "debit card" is the generic term used. Debit cards issued are predominantly Visa Debit, with Debit Mastercard becoming increasingly common. Maestro, Visa Electron and UnionPay are also in circulation. Banks do not charge customers for EFTPOS transactions in the UK, but some retailers used to make small charges, particularly for small transaction amounts. However, the UK Government introduced legislation on 13 January 2018 banning all surcharges for card payments, including those made online and through services such as PayPal. The UK has converted all debit cards in circulation to Chip and PIN (except for Chip and Signature cards issued to people with certain disabilities and non-reloadable prepaid cards), based on the EMV standard, to increase transaction security; however, PINs are not required for Internet transactions (though some banks employ additional security measures for online transactions such as Verified by Visa and Mastercard Secure Code), nor for most contactless transactions.

In the United Kingdom, banks started to issue debit cards in the mid-1980s to reduce the number of cheques being used at the point of sale, which are costly for the banks to process; the first bank to do so was Barclays with the Barclays Connect card. As in most countries, fees paid by merchants in the UK to accept credit cards are a percentage of the transaction amount, which funds cardholders' interest-free credit periods as well as incentive schemes such as points or cashback. For consumer credit cards issued within the EEA, the interchange fee is capped at 0.3%, with a cap of 0.2% for debit cards, although the merchant acquirers may charge the merchant a higher fee. Most debit cards in the UK lack the advantages offered to holders of UK-issued credit cards, such as free incentives (points, cashback etc.; the Tesco Bank debit card was one exception), interest-free credit and protection against defaulting merchants under Section 75 of the Consumer Credit Act 1974. Almost all establishments in the UK that accept credit cards also accept debit cards. Some merchants, for cost reasons, accept debit cards but not credit cards, and some smaller retailers only accept card payments for purchases above a certain value, typically £5 or £10.

The 21st century has seen an increase in Challenger banks in the United Kingdom, with benefits including fee-free overseas spending. Notable challenger banks include Monzo, Revolut and Starling Bank.

=== UEMOA ===
It is the West Africa Economic and Monetary Union federating eight countries: Benin, Burkina Faso, Ivory Coast, Guinea-Bissau, Mali, Niger, Senegal and Togo.

GIM-UEMOA is the regional switch federating more than 120 members (banks, microfinances, electronic money issuers, etc.). All interbank cards transactions between banks in the same country or between banks in two different countries UEMOA zone are routed and cleared by GIM-UEMOA. The settlement is done on Central Bank RTGS.

GIM-UEMOA also provides some processing products and services to more than 50 banks in UEMOA zone and out of UEMOA zone.

=== United States ===
In the U.S., EFTPOS is universally referred to simply as debit. The largest pre-paid debit card company is Green Dot Corporation, by market capitalization. The same interbank networks that operate the ATM network also operate the POS network. Most interbank networks, such as Pulse, NYCE, MAC, Tyme, SHAZAM, STAR, and so on, are regional and do not overlap, however, most ATM/POS networks have agreements to accept each other's cards. This means that cards issued by one network will typically work anywhere they accept ATM/POS cards for payment. For example, a NYCE card will work at a Pulse POS terminal or ATM, and vice versa. Debit cards in the United States are usually issued with a Visa, Mastercard, Discover or American Express logo allowing use of their signature-based networks. In 2018, there were 5.836 billion debit cards in circulation in the U.S., and 71.7% were prepaid cards.

U.S. Federal law caps the liability of a U.S. debit card user in case of loss or theft at US$50 if the loss or theft is reported to the issuing bank in two business days after the customer notices the loss. Most banks will, however, set this limit to $0 for debit cards issued to their customers which are linked to their checking or savings account. Unlike credit cards, loss or theft reported more than two business days after being discovered is capped at $500 (vs. $50 for credit cards), and if reported more than 60 calendar days after the statement is sent all the money in the account may be lost.

The fees charged to merchants for offline debit purchases vis-à-vis the lack of fees charged to merchants for processing online debit purchases and paper checks have prompted some major merchants in the U.S. to file lawsuits against debit-card transaction processors, such as Visa and Mastercard. In 2003, Visa and Mastercard agreed to settle the largest of these lawsuits for $2 billion and $1 billion, respectively.

Some consumers prefer "credit" transactions because of the lack of a fee charged to the consumer/purchaser. A few debit cards in the U.S. offer rewards for using "credit". However, since "credit" transactions cost more for merchants, many terminals at PIN-accepting merchant locations now make the "credit" function more difficult to access.

As a result of the Dodd–Frank Wall Street Reform and Consumer Protection Act, U.S. merchants can now set a minimum purchase amount for credit card transactions, as long as it does not exceed $10.

==== FSA, HRA, and HSA debit cards ====
In the United States, an FSA debit card only allow medical expenses. It is used by some banks for withdrawals from their healthcare FSAs (Flexible Savings Account) medical savings accounts (MSA), and health savings accounts (HSA) as well. They have Visa or Mastercard logos, but cannot be used as "debit cards", only as "credit cards". Furthermore, they are not accepted by all merchants that accept debit and credit cards, but only by those that specifically accept FSA debit cards. Merchant codes and product codes are used at the point of sale (required by law by certain merchants by certain states in the U.S.) to restrict sales if they do not qualify. Because of the extra checking and documenting that goes on, later, the statement can be used to substantiate these purchases for tax deductions. In the occasional instance that a qualifying purchase is rejected, another form of payment must be used (a check or payment from another account and a claim for reimbursement later). In the more likely case that non-qualifying items are accepted, the consumer is technically still responsible, and the discrepancy could be revealed during an audit. A small but growing segment of the debit card business in the U.S. involves access to tax-favored spending accounts such as FSAs, HRAs, and HSAs. Most of these debit cards are for medical expenses, though a few are also issued for dependent care and transportation expenses.

Traditionally, FSAs (the oldest of these accounts) were accessed only through claims for reimbursement after incurring, and often paying, an out-of-pocket expense; this often happens after the funds have already been deducted from the employee's paycheck. (FSAs are usually funded by payroll deduction.) The only method permitted by the Internal Revenue Service (IRS) to avoid this "double-dipping" for medical FSAs and HRAs is through accurate and auditable reporting on the tax return. Statements on the debit card that say "for medical uses only" are invalid for several reasons: (1) The merchant and issuing banks have no way of quickly determining whether the entire purchase qualifies for the customer's type of tax benefit; (2) the customer also has no quick way of knowing; often has mixed purchases by necessity or convenience; and can easily make mistakes; (3) extra contractual clauses between the customer and issuing bank would cross-over into the payment processing standards, creating additional confusion (for example if a customer was penalized for accidentally purchasing a non-qualifying item, it would undercut the potential savings advantages of the account). Therefore, using the card exclusively for qualifying purchases may be convenient for the customer, but it has nothing to do with how the card can actually be used. If the bank rejects a transaction, for instance, because it is not at a recognized drug store, then it would be causing harm and confusion to the cardholder. In the United States, not all medical service or supply stores are capable of providing the correct information so an FSA debit card issuer can honor every transaction-if rejected or documentation is not deemed enough to satisfy regulations, cardholders may have to send in forms manually.

One difference between FSAs and HSAs is the matter of yearend and rollovers: FSAs began as per calendar year, although by 2013 rollovers were introduced.

=== Uruguay ===
Debit cards are accepted in a relatively large number of stores, both large and small in Uruguay; but their use has so far remained low as compared to credit cards at ATMs. Since August 2014, with the Financial Inclusion Law coming into force, end consumers obtain a 4% VAT deduction for using debit cards in their purchases.

=== Venezuela ===
There has been a lack of cash due to the Venezuelan economic crisis and thus the demand for and use of debit cards has increased greatly in recent years. One reason why a noticeable percentage of businesses have closed is a lack of payment terminals. The most used brands are Maestro (debit card) and Visa Electron.

=== Vietnam ===
In Vietnam, debit cards are issued by banks in collaboration with the National Payment Corporation of Vietnam, abbreviated as NAPAS. Most banks issue this type of card. Customers can simply go to the nearest branch to register or open a debit card online. VISA Debit and Mastercard Debit are the most widely issued cards in Vietnam.

As of June 2023, there are over 94 million debit cards in circulation in Vietnam. The number of cards is growing at an average rate of 18% per year. The transaction value reached over 1,200 trillion VND per year. More than 80% of transactions are made at ATMs.

== See also ==
- Card (disambiguation)
- ATM card
- Cantaloupe, Inc.
- Charge card
- Credit card
- Debit card cashback
- Electronic funds transfer
- Electronic Payment Services
- EPAS
- Interac
- Inventory information approval system, a point-of-sale technology used with FSA debit cards
- Payment card
- Payments Council
- Payoneer
- Point-of-sale (POS)
