= Girocard =

Interbank network and debit card service

girocard
- Operating area: Germany
- Members: 2,000
- ATMs: 54,000
- Website: www.girocard.eu

girocard is an interbank network and debit card service in Germany connecting virtually all automated teller machines (ATMs) and banks. It is based on standards and agreements developed by the German Banking Industry Committee.

German girocards are commonly co-branded with Mastercard's Maestro/Cirrus or Visa's V Pay logo, allowing cardholders to use them in other European countries. As another co-badging option, combined girocard/JCB cards were introduced in 2016.

The Deutscher Sparkassen- und Giroverband (German Savings Banks Association) has announced that upcoming Sparkassen-Cards will also function as full Debit Mastercard or Visa Debit cards in addition to girocards and will have a 16-digit Mastercard/Visa number to pay online. Some banks are phasing out girocards. DKB, for instance, starting in 2023 issues its customers a Visa Debit card and charges extra for a Girocard.

== History ==
German banks formed an interbank network connecting virtually all German ATMs. The network used Eurocheque guarantee cards as ATM cards and did not have a name or trademark of its own. In 1991, the electronic cash debit card service was introduced using the same cards, replacing the Geldkarte ATM and POS scheme in the territory of former-East Germany. The cards used for all three payment methods were simply known as Eurocheque card (German Eurocheque-Karte).

When the Eurocheque system was disbanded at the end of 2001, the cards could no longer use the Eurocheque brand. However, German banks continued to use the EC logo, which was simply re-interpreted as "electronic cash" and the cards were colloquially known as an EC card (German EC-Karte). The ATM network still did not have a brand name and was generically called "Deutsches Geldautomaten-System" (German ATM System).

In 2007, the German Banking Industry Committee introduced "girocard" as a common name for electronic cash and the German ATM network. girocard purports to be SEPA-compliant.

== Services ==
=== POS ===
The girocard network is used for point-of-sale payments within Germany. Two principal processing methods can be used: chip-and-pin guaranteed girocard payment and chip-and-signature non-guaranteed Electronic Direct Debit (ELV, Elektronisches Lastschriftverfahren).

About 770,000 places in Germany accepted girocard payments in summer 2016 (approximately one location per 106 inhabitants). The slow pace of the expansion of the girocard acceptance network has attracted criticism from authors who have pointed out that, in the UK, the once-dominant Switch/Maestro debit cards were accepted at 571,268 locations in 2001 (one location per 103 inhabitants) and at over 900,000 places in 2005 – "from high street shops to pubs, opticians, websites, cinemas – even local councils".

A common misconception is that girocard can be used for card-not-present payments. girocards are generally not equipped for e-commerce and any attempt to use the internal 19-digit card number, starting with 672 or 482, through Maestro or V Pay will fail. SEPA Direct Debit transactions are occasionally mislabeled as EC or girocard e-commerce transactions.

=== ATM network ===
The German automated teller machine (ATM) network connects virtually all German ATMs. However, German banks charge high out-of-network ATM usage fees (up to €10) from customers using girocards from unaffiliated banks. (As surcharges for cash withdrawals within the Visa or Mastercard networks are rather uncommon, certain specialty banks, mostly online banks and ethical banks, have started to issue Visa Debit and Debit Mastercard cards to their German customers for free cash withdrawals.)

There are several cooperations reducing or waiving these fees:

- EUFISERV is a European compact which includes the Sparkasse saving banks in Germany to waive the fees for customers of other local branches.
- Bankcard-Servicenetz is a cooperation of most co-operative banks to waive or reduce the fees for other co-operative banks.
- Cash Group is a cooperation of major private banks, which mutually waive the fees.
- CashPool is a cooperation of smaller private banks (including many virtual banks), which mutually waive the fees.

Some banks participate in more than one cooperation and therefore offer free cash withdrawals at more than 85% of all German ATMs. In addition, some large chain stores such as REWE, PENNY Markt, toom Baumarkt and Netto Marken-Discount offer cashback at the till. This service is free of charge, but requires a minimum purchase amount of €20. Cashback is limited to €200 per day.

== Mobile Payment and Digital Wallet ==
Sparkassen and cooperative banks are the only German banks to offer the girocard for the digital wallet. Sparkassen-Cards in digital wallets also work with the Debit Mastercard and Visa Debit.

== See also ==
- Single Euro Payments Area
- Debit card
- Laser (debit card)
