= VITAband =

Weatherproof wristband

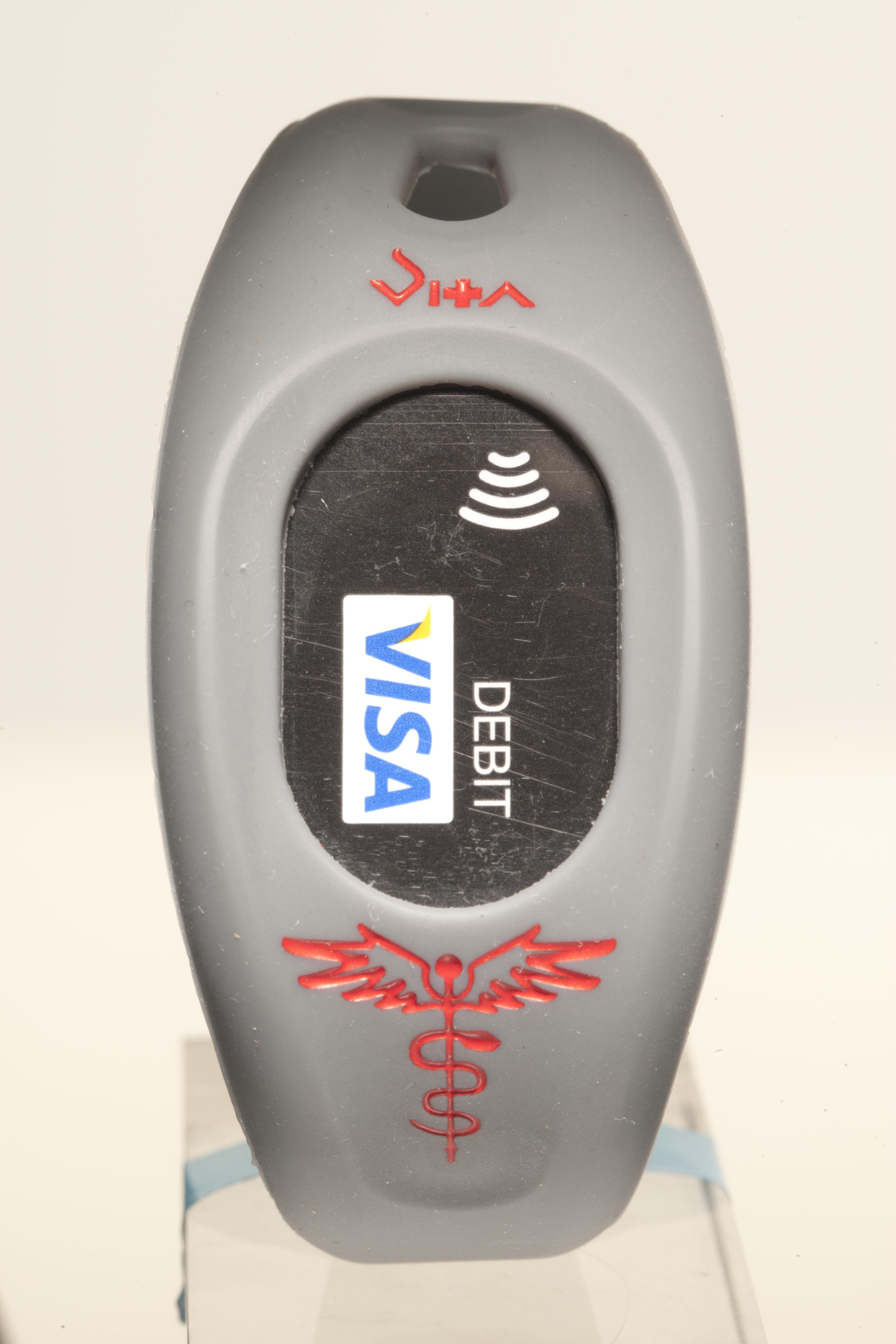
A VITAband showing a Visa Debit card

VITAband is a silicone encircling strip worn on the wrist. It can be referred to a bracelet-like band of a wristwatch, to the cuff or other part of a sleeve that covers the wrist. It is a lightweight, waterproof and hypoallergenic flexible wristband that is used when jogging, running, cycling or hiking, or when carrying a wallet is inconvenient. VITAband holds emergency medical information and Visa RFID credit card information. The wristband has two unique features. It comprises an integrated Visa Debit card with payWave wireless functionality and a toll-free phone number with unique identity code that can be used by EMTs to retrieve health information and contacts in case of an accident or health emergency.

== History ==
VITAband was created by David Waxman and Jason Brown in 2007 and was launched in September 2009. The idea was conceived from medical ID bracelet but the designers had targeted athletes. So, they set out to design a medical ID bracelet that was comfortable to wear while jogging, running, cycling, hiking, etc., along with being versatile enough to use during exercise. VITAband is a combination of design and function which conveniently and securely stores emergency information remotely and offers access to money by contactless payment.

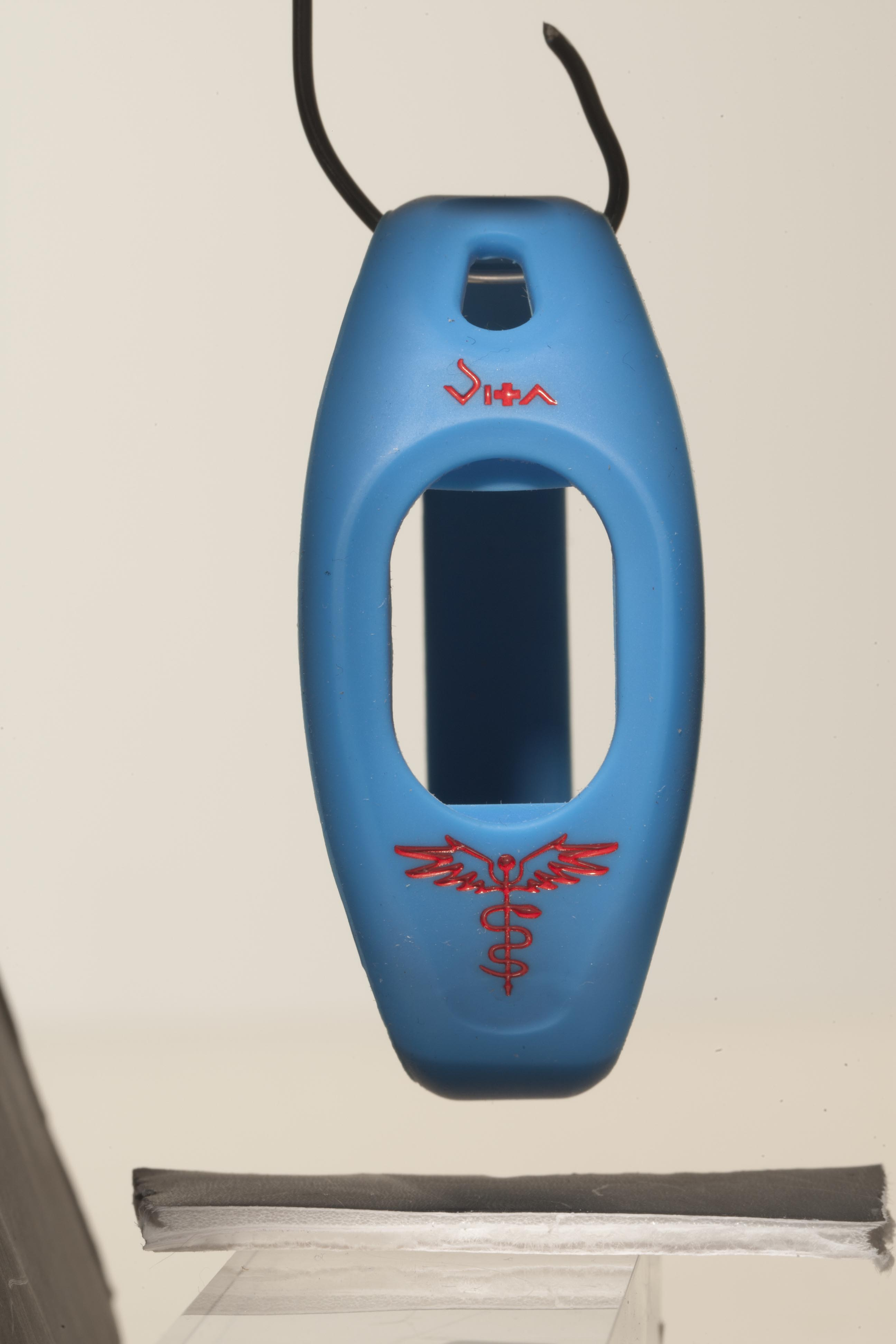
VITAband

== Description ==
The designers wanted to set their product apart from others so they integrated contactless payment technology into the band. A user has to set up his Emergency Response Profile (ERP), which includes basic contact information, blood type, allergies, insurance information, medications, and emergency contacts. Annual subscription is required to maintain the Emergency Response Profile (ERP) In the case of an emergency, medical professionals are trained to look for the number on the user's VITAband and then would have instant access to their ERP. It's a simple bracelet that is keyed to a remote website that holds vital information, such as name, address, and any medical conditions a user might have. The system accepts insurance information. An integrated Visa debit card with payWave wireless functionality has been used. Via this technology, the user makes a payment by waving the chip in front of a credit card terminal. To use the contactless payment via VITAband which is a prepaid card, the user must first set up a VITAband Visa prepaid card. Users can load the card with anywhere from US$25 to $500 via the company website.

== Size ==
VITAband comes in two sizes: a small size of 180 mm (7.1 in) and a large size of 202 mm (8.0 in).
