= Solo (debit card) =

Debit card in the United Kingdom

- Product type: Debit card
- Current owner: MasterCard
- Country: United Kingdom
- Introduced: 1 July 1997
- Discontinued: 31 March 2011
- Related brands: Maestro, Switch
- Website: solocard.co.uk at the Wayback Machine (archived 2009-09-24)

An HSBC Solo debit card issued in Britain in the end of 2007

Solo was a debit card in the United Kingdom introduced as a sister to the then existing Switch. It was later merged with the Maestro debit card brand of the Mastercard corporation. Launched on 1 July 1997, by the Switch Card Scheme, it was designed for use on deposit accounts, as well as by customers who did not qualify for a Switch card (or, later, Maestro card) on current accounts, such as teenagers. The Solo card scheme was decommissioned permanently on 31 March 2011.

== Operation ==
Solo was issued as a multifunction cash card by NatWest and the Royal Bank of Scotland to customers over the age of 11 and by HSBC Bank (formerly Midland Bank) to customers over the age of 13; however, NatWest Group and HSBC both then issued Visa Debit cards in place of Solo. Like its main rival, Visa Electron, Solo cards required all transactions receive electronic authorisation from the issuing bank.

Such authorisation would not be given if there were insufficient cleared funds in the cardholder's account. Solo cards were linked to the Switch processing system (later re-branded as Maestro); however, some merchants differentiated between Solo and Switch through their numbering scheme to prevent under 18s from purchasing online.

Due to their availability to minors, they could be used as a simple age vetting mechanism; for example, when online grocers Ocado accepted Solo, they refused to sell razor blades or alcoholic beverages to those paying with the card. Solo cards were also issued to people with a bad credit history to reduce the liability for the issuing bank.
