= Switch (debit card) =

British debit card, 1988–2002

- Product type: Debit card
- Current owner: MasterCard
- Country: United Kingdom
- Introduced: 1988
- Discontinued: 2002
- Related brands: Maestro
- Website: switch.co.uk at the Wayback Machine (archived 2000-03-01)

Switch was a debit card brand in the United Kingdom from 1988 until 2002.

== History ==
Switch was launched in 1988 by Midland Bank, National Westminster Bank and The Royal Bank of Scotland as a multifunction cheque guarantee and cash card. It was then merged with Maestro, which is owned by MasterCard. This merger was announced in August 2002. The merger was also intended to increase the acceptance of foreign Maestro cards in the United Kingdom. The deal was referred to as the "penguin wedding," due to its advertisements of penguins in different international settings created by Joel Veitch.

Since 2010, Switch cards have been out of circulation and banks have migrated customers from Switch to Maestro. This change also led to the discontinuation of Solo debit cards, due to the underlying network being retired.

Switch/Maestro cards issued by certain banks carried an issue number on the bottom of the card corresponding to the number of times a card had been issued on a particular account. This was usually because the current account number the card was linked to actually formed a large part of the card number, and therefore the card number could not be readily changed in case of loss or the card expiring.

In January 2009, First Direct and HSBC discontinued the use of Maestro card, issuing Visa Debit cards to new customers, and a gradual roll out throughout 2009 to existing customers. That September, Clydesdale Bank and Yorkshire Bank (then owned by National Australia Bank), started the process of replacing the Maestro card with a Debit Mastercard for their current accounts, except for the Readycash and Student accounts, for which the Maestro card continued to be issued.

In the same month the Royal Bank of Scotland Group (Europe's largest debit card issuer which included the Royal Bank of Scotland, NatWest, Coutts and Ulster Bank) switched from Maestro to Visa Debit, a process that took two years to complete.
