= Express Payment System =

The EPS logo

The Express Payment System, more commonly known as the EPS, was the EFTPOS system originally of the ATM cards of Bank of the Philippine Islands and its subsidiaries, BPI Family Savings Bank and BPI Direct Savings Bank. Today, it is the EFTPOS system of the Expressnet interbank network in the Philippines. The system is the most popular EFTPOS system for ATM cardholders in the Philippines and is accepted nationwide. Rivals of the network include MegaLink's PayLink and the similarly named BancNet Payment System (BPS).

== Expansion ==
Although the Philippines is largely still a cash-based society, the EPS is slowly getting widespread prominence. Since its launch, it has expanded to be found in many stores nationwide and has since expanded from its roots with BPI, which also pioneered Expressnet. In fact, the EPS is no longer limited to shopping: the EPS can also be used for things such as paying doctor's fees or paying for a haircut with the swipe of one's ATM card. Currently, there are more than 13,000 EPS merchants throughout the Philippines.

In 2005, the EPS expanded to include the ATM cards of Banco de Oro and Land Bank of the Philippines, both Expressnet members. However, many EPS merchants claim that their EPS terminal works only with BPI ATM cards or do not know how to use Banco de Oro or Landbank cards with the EPS terminal; this is because virtually all EPS terminals are BPI terminals (Banco de Oro and Landbank EPS terminals debuted just recently). Also, Banco de Oro and Landbank ATM cards, unlike BPI ATM cards, cannot be directly swiped on an EPS terminal. In order to use these cards, an EPS merchant must enter the number 7 on the main screen then swipe the card to use these ATM cards. As of 2005, HSBC and its subsidiary, HSBC Savings Bank, although both members of Expressnet, do not participate in the EPS system, meaning that HSBC and HSBC Savings Bank ATM cards cannot be used on an EPS terminal.

In addition to functioning as an ATM EFTPOS terminal, EPS terminals also accept BPI credit, debit and prepaid cards. However, these transactions are considered as BPI Express Credit transactions and not as EPS transactions.

Banco de Oro has its own terminal independent of the EPS either branded under the SM name or under its own name. Terminals under either name accept all Banco de Oro cards (Smarteller ATM card and derivatives, BDO Gift Card, BDO Cash Card and BDO credit cards) and have the functions of an EPS terminal. Terminals under the SM name, however, have extended capabilities such as having the capabilities of an EPS, PayLink and BPS terminal (and even the ATM cards of non-affiliated banks) all in one as well as the acceptance of other banks' credit, debit and prepaid cards.

The terminal can be found depending on the name. Terminals under the SM name can be found in all SM stores, such as their supermarkets, department stores and stores such as Surplus Shop and Toy Kingdom. Terminals under the Banco de Oro name can be found in businesses that accept Banco de Oro cards before Banco de Oro joined the EPS. Some merchants though still use the Banco de Oro terminal.

== See also ==
- Expressnet
