= Maestro (debit card) =

Debit card from Mastercard

Mastercard Maestro
- Maestro logo used since July 14, 2016
- Product type: Debit card
- Current owner: Mastercard Inc.
- Country: United States
- Introduced: 1991
- Discontinued: July 1, 2023 (few European countries only)
- Related brands: Debit Mastercard
- Markets: Worldwide
- Website: www.mastercard.com

Mastercard Maestro is a brand of debit cards and prepaid cards owned by Mastercard that was introduced in 1991. Maestro is accepted at around fifteen million point of sale outlets in 93 countries.

On July 1, 2023, Mastercard began phasing out Maestro across Europe. European banks and other card issuers are now required to replace expired or lost Maestro cards with a different card.

== Functionality ==
Maestro debit cards are obtained from associate banks and are linked to the cardholder's savings account, current account or any of several other types of accounts, while prepaid cards do not require a bank account to operate. Maestro cards can be used at point of sale (POS) and ATMs. Payments are made by swiping cards through the payment terminal, insertion into a chip and PIN device or by a contactless reader. The payment is authorized by the card issuer to ensure that the cardholder has sufficient funds in their account to make the purchase. The cardholder then confirms the payment by either signing the sales receipt or entering their 4- to 6-digit PIN, except with contactless transactions below a specified amount for which no further verification is required.

Maestro often requires on-line electronic authorization for every transaction, although Mastercard's rules permit the establishment of floor limits on Maestro EMV chip transactions only. Not only must the information stored in either the chip or the magnetic stripe be read, but this has to be sent from the merchant to the issuing bank, the issuing bank then has to respond with an affirmative authorization. If the information is not read, the issuer will decline the transaction, regardless of any disposable amount on the connected account, except in the Asia Pacific region, where manual keyed entry is permitted under some circumstances. This is different from most other debit and credit cards, where the information can be entered manually into the terminal (i.e. by typing the 13 to 19 digits and the expiry date on the terminal) and still be approved by the issuer or stand-in processor. In most countries, other than those specified in Mastercard's rules, a PIN rather than a signature is always required to authorise a Maestro transaction, except where no CVM (Cardholder Verification Method) is required.

== Acceptance and availability ==
=== Americas ===
Country/Region	Available	Replaced	Replaced by	Notes
Argentina	Yes			Maestro is the card used by the Banco de la Nación Argentina and other banks, mostly state-run or provincial banks.
Brazil	Yes*	Redeshop		Mastercard acquired the existing Redeshop service in 2002 and rebranded it as Maestro, a few years later Mastercard rebranded their Mastercard Maestro to “Mastercard Débito“, where the name may erroneously suggest that it is a “Debit Mastercard“, but internally the cards are still Maestro. It is standard for most Brazilian credit cards to have a "dual-function" (when offered by the bank) where usually the bank debit card (Mastercard Maestro, Visa Electron or Elo) also has a credit function (usually the only brand in front of the card is Mastercard, Visa or Elo). When inserting, swiping or tapping the card it presents both functions to PoS and the seller selects which one to use.
Canada	Yes*			In Canada, virtually all debit card transactions are processed over the Interac network. However, as Interac is a domestic company, some debit cards are dual-networked with Maestro to facilitate international purchases.
Chile	Yes*			Maestro debit cards are widely used, dual-branded with RedCompra, issued by the majority of banks (Santander issued only Maestro debit cards up to 2020). They operate through the local Transbank and Cirrus network. Usually, Chilean Maestro cards have a small logo on the back of the card. Debit Mastercard cards are issued by Coopeuch and Santander. Chilean Maestro cards usually are contactless.
Colombia	Yes			Since almost five years ago, banks in Colombia stopped issuing Maestro debit cards and replaced them with Mastercard debit cards.
United States	Yes		Visa and Cirrus at some banks	Maestro is a PIN-based debit card network closely related to the Cirrus ATM network, also owned by Mastercard. Like other PIN-debit networks in the U.S., Maestro there relies solely on a standard card and PIN, without a chip; signature-debit transactions in the U.S. are handled through the main Mastercard network or the rival Visa network. RBS's former U.S. subsidiary, Citizens Financial Group, switched to Visa, though like most foreign banks with operations in the United States, it used MasterCard's Cirrus network and the card participated in the Mastercard SecureCode initiative. Maestro is accepted at several banks (First Hawaiian and Home Street Bank) in Hawaii.
Uruguay	Yes	Debit Mastercard		Maestro was until recently the only debit card network issued by Banco de la República Oriental del Uruguay. Since BROU is the largest bank in Uruguay, this means that Maestro is likely the largest network in Uruguay. On 2025 BROU announced the plan to replace all Maestro debit cards with Debit Mastercard by the end of the first semester of 2026 in successive waves of 50.000 cards with up to 60 days to replace the card after notification
Venezuela	Yes			Maestro is extremely popular. It is as of 2014, the leading debit card, issued by almost all major banks in the country. It is widely accepted in PoS. It works on all ATMs showing the Suiche7B, Mastercard, Conexus and Cirrus logos.

=== Asia ===
Country/Region	Available	Replaced	Replaced by	Notes
China	No		Debit Mastercard or Visa Debit	Bank of China used Maestro as its "international" debit card system in some areas before, but stopped issuing it from September 2016. In April 2017, they launched "Cross-Border" EMV Debit Card with Visa and Mastercard. Most ATMs owned by nationwide commercial banks still accept Maestro card. Also, certain ATMs will present the user with foreign language options upon insertion of a Maestro card.
Hong Kong	No		Debit Mastercard	Standard Chartered Hong Kong used Maestro as one of the ATM card systems. However, the clients should make the request for using the Maestro in advance, or the bank would only issue the UnionPay ATM Card to new clients as default. In end-2021, the Bank announced the replacement of Maestro cards with MasterCard debit card.
India	Yes		Debit Mastercard	Maestro is issued by most major banks, except ICICI Bank. Maestro issuing banks include the State Bank of India (India's largest bank), State Bank's affiliate banks, Punjab National Bank, Syndicate Bank, Oriental Bank of Commerce, Bank of Rajasthan, etc. The bank would only issue the RuPay ATM Card to new clients as default.
Israel	No			Maestro Cards cannot be used at point of sales locations to make purchases but the Cirrus network is accepted at a majority of cash points most of the time. The exception is the 'First International Bank of Israel' (FIBI) who do not accept Cirrus. The most common debit cards by Mastercard are branded Mastercard Direct (operated for the banks offer the card by Isracard). Otherwise (but to a much smaller scale) offered Mastercard Debit by banks like Israeli Discount Bank & Mercantile Bank.
Philippines	Yes		Debit Mastercard	
Indonesia	Yes		Debit Mastercard	Most banks that previously issued Maestro cards have transitioned to Debit Mastercard for new or existing customers who renew their cards.
Singapore	Yes		Debit Mastercard	
Taiwan	Yes		Debit Mastercard	
South Korea	Yes			
Macau	No			

=== Europe ===
Country/Region	Available	Replaced	Replaced by	Notes
Austria	Yes	Eurocheque	Debit Mastercard	Beginning with 2019, Austria's largest bank by assets Erste Group began replacing Austrian Maestro cards with Debit Mastercard. Other banks followed in 2020 and 2021.
Belgium	Yes		Visa Debit or Debit Mastercard	Co-branded with Bancontact. BNP Paribas Fortis group started issuing co-branded Bancontact and Visa Debit cards in 2021. Keytrade Bank also started issuing co-branded Bancontact/Visa Debit cards in 2023. Two Crelan Group-owned banks (Crelan and Europabank) also switched over to co-branded Visa Debit/Bancontact debit cards (Axa Bank will merge with Crelan itself in June 2024). Belfius, KBC Group, Beobank & Argenta (bank) started issuing co-branded Bancontact/Debit Mastercard in 2023.
Bosnia and Herzegovina	Yes		Debit Mastercard	UniCredit Bank made the switch from Maestro to Mastercard on June 1, 2016.
Croatia	Yes		Visa Debit or Debit Mastercard	Reiffeisenbank Hrvatska replaced Maestro card with Debit Mastercard (with vertical design) in 2019. Erste Bank replaced Maestro with Visa Debit in 2020, and Croatia's largest bank, Zagrebačka banka, did the same in 2021.
Denmark	Yes		Debit Mastercard	Maestro has been replaced by the banks that issued it with Debit Mastercard. Moreover, the largest Danish bank Danske Bank has replaced all of its cash cards with Debit Mastercards.
Germany	Yes	Eurocheque	Debit Mastercard	In most cases co-branded with the German Girocard logo, but they cannot be used as Maestro over the telephone or on the internet. As of 2020, the Sparkassen-Finanzgruppe announced to introduce a new co-branded Girocard using the Debit Mastercard system and effectively replacing the Maestro co-badge slowly.
Greece	Yes		Debit Mastercard	Maestro debit cards have been issued by several major banks. However, as of March 2015 all four major Greek banks have replaced Maestro cards with contactless Debit Mastercard.
Iceland	Yes		Debit Mastercard or Visa Debit	Maestro debit cards have been issued by several major banks. For example: an old Íslandsbanki request form for banking products includes Maestro and Electron debit card options: However, as of 2015, all banks have replaced them with contactless Debit Mastercard or Visa Debit cards.
Ireland	Yes	Laser	Debit Mastercard or Visa Debit	Laser, which was co-branded with Maestro, has been replaced by Visa Debit and Debit Mastercard. The Laser debit card has been phased out by all banks and ceased to operate from March 2014. Irish Laser cards carried Maestro co-branding from 2008 onwards. They were intended to be used with chip and PIN POS systems. The chip on the card was programmed with two applications, one for Laser and one for Maestro. POS transactions were normally processed over the Laser network in Ireland and the Maestro network when the card was used abroad. Some POS terminals prompted users to manually select Laser or Maestro before completing the transaction. Laser cards could be processed as Maestro in most POS terminals worldwide for chip and PIN or swipe and sign transactions (where still accepted). Internet and telephone-based retailers, however, needed to be set up specifically to accept Irish Laser/Maestro cards. Transactions made with these cards were often secured by MasterCard's SecureCode system to verify the cardholder's identity. These cards were usually multi-functional and operated as a debit card as well as an ATM Card which could be used for accessing ATMs. Some banks also allowed customers to use their cards to deposit or withdraw money over the counter or at An Post post offices using their debit card and PIN. Historically the cards often contained a Cheque guarantee card function indicated by a hologram. This scheme was shut down in 2011. Foreign-issued Maestro cards are still accepted in Ireland in ATMs and by many POS machines. However, acceptance of Visa and MasterCard debit/credit cards is more reliably universal at POS terminals.
Italy	Yes			Usually co-branded with the national Bancomat/PagoBancomat and international Cirrus scheme. Most banks issue Mastercard Maestro, while some issue Visa Debit and V Pay cards.
Netherlands	Yes	PIN	Debit Mastercard or Visa Debit	Most banks issue Maestro debit cards, with only De Volksbank and ING offering both V Pay and Maestro branded cards. Prior to January 1, 2012, Dutch Maestro debit cards were co-branded with the national PIN scheme. This scheme has since been retired and replaced by Maestro and V Pay. And starting in 2022 shop owners will be required to start adding support for Debit Mastercard & Visa Debit to their POS-terminals.
Romania	Yes		Debit Mastercard	Maestro was a popular debit card which was offered by major banks for about 20 years until it was replaced with other Card Schemes, mainly with Mastercard Debit and Visa Debit.
Russia	No		Mir	Maestro was issued by banks including Sberbank, which issues cards such as Mastercard Maestro Momentum and the Mastercard Maestro Social debit card. After the Russian invasion of Ukraine, banks stopped issuing Visa, MasterCard and Maestro cards as they left Russia, and started issuing cards with Mir Payment System. Despite that, old and non-expired Maestro cards still work inside Russia.
Serbia	Yes		Visa Debit	Maestro debit cards are issued by several banks in Serbia. The main issuer was Banca Intesa Beograd until, in September 2012, Banca Intesa Beograd began to switch to Visa.
Switzerland	Yes		Debit Mastercard or Visa Debit	
United Kingdom	Yes	Switch	Debit Mastercard or Visa Debit	The former Switch debit card system was re-branded as Maestro. Underneath the branding, however, the system was still the old Switch one and the cards were still fundamentally Switch. In 2011, MasterCard aligned UK domestic Maestro cards (the former Switch) with the standard international Maestro system, ending its status as a separate card scheme. This change also led to the discontinuation of the Solo debit card. In January 2009 First Direct and HSBC discontinued the use of Maestro cards, issuing Visa Debit cards to new customers and a gradual roll-out throughout 2009 to existing customers. In September of the same year, the British arms of the National Australia Bank, namely Clydesdale Bank and Yorkshire Bank, started the process of replacing the Maestro card with a Debit Mastercard for their current accounts, except for the Readycash and Student accounts, for which the Maestro card continued to be issued until 2015. Likewise, in the same month the Royal Bank of Scotland Group (Europe's largest debit card issuer which includes the NatWest, Coutts, Royal Bank of Scotland and Ulster Bank brands) switched from Maestro to Visa Debit, a process that took two years to complete. This effectively meant that only a few smaller UK banks would be issuing Maestro cards. In 2015, Bank of Ireland UK replaced its Maestro debit cards with Visa Debit cards. Few if any issuers still issue Maestro cards nowadays in the UK, and acceptance of non-UK Maestro cards is patchy.

== Logo history ==
Maestro logo used from May 1992 until September 1996

Maestro logo used from September 1996 until 14 July 2016.

Maestro logo used since 14 July 2016.

Mastercard Maestro logo used from 2004 in Brazil only.

== See also ==
- RuPay
- ATM usage fees
