= V Pay =

Single Euro Payments Area (SEPA) debit card

- Product type: Debit card
- Current owner: Visa Inc.
- Country: United States
- Related brands: Visa Electron, Visa Debit
- Markets: Europe
- Website: www.visa.com

V Pay is a Single Euro Payments Area (SEPA) debit card for use in Europe, issued by Visa Europe. It uses the EMV chip and PIN system and can be co-branded with various national debit card schemes such as Germany’s Girocard or Italy's PagoBancomat.

== Overview ==
The V Pay debit card system competes with the Mastercard Maestro debit card product. However, unlike Mastercard Maestro, V Pay cards cannot be used in non-EMV environments, limiting its acceptance to those countries and merchants that use this system. Also unlike Mastercard Maestro, which is issued and accepted globally, V Pay is designed as a specifically European product, and is not issued or accepted outside European countries except for some of their overseas territories. However, some cards are co-branded with the Visa Electron system, which allows using them outside Europe.

V Pay cards began to be accepted at merchants in France and Greece in 2005, and acceptance had since expanded to more European countries.

However from 2019, the V Pay system is gradually phased-out in favor of Visa Debit.
