= Laser (debit card) =

Irish debit card scheme, 1996–2014

- Location: Ireland
- Launched: April 1996; 29 years ago
- Discontinued: 28 February 2014
- Technology: EMV and previously Magnetic stripe debit card
- Operator: Laser Card Services Limited
- Currency: Euro (2002–2014); Irish pounds (1996–2002)
- Website: lasercard.ie at the Wayback Machine (archived 2012-02-08)

Laser was a debit card scheme in Ireland between 1996 and 2014. It was operated by Laser Card Services Limited, a non profit body owned by four leading financial institutions in Ireland and overseen since 2008 by the Oversight Unit of the Central Bank. The scheme was launched in April 1996, and in 2010, there were almost three million Laser cards in circulation.

195 million transactions worth almost €11.2 billion were carried out on those cards in 2009. From 2007, the financial institutions which had issued Laser cards began to replace them with Visa or MasterCard debit cards. Laser cards were withdrawn from the market on 28 February 2014.

== Use ==
Laser was primarily an electronic point of sale debit card, but could also be used by telephone and internet, at ATMs and to pay regular bills by direct debit.

When purchasing goods or services with a Laser card up to €100 cashback could be given to cardholders and this value was simply added to the purchase price. Some retailers set a lower maximum cashback value, depending on what cash was available to them in the till or their own policy. Many Irish businesses that operate online accepted Laser cards prior to their discontinuation.

From 2005, some Laser card holders were provided with co branded Laser/Maestro cards; from 1 January 2008, all Laser cards were co branded. The co branded cards were chip and PIN cards with both Laser and Maestro functions. The Laser facility was for use in Ireland only whereas the Maestro facility was, in theory, used both domestically and internationally, but international Maestro payments were quite often rejected.

The Maestro facility was not usable internationally online or by telephone. While it was possible for any bank in the Single Euro Payments Area, regardless of location, to join the Laser card scheme, no interest in joining the scheme was expressed by banks outside Ireland.

== Participating financial institutions ==
In 2007, Halifax Ireland announced that it would be the first bank in Ireland to offer a Visa Debit card rather than the Laser debit card (Halifax was never a member of Laser Card Services Limited). In 2008, Ulster Bank dropped Laser, in favour of Visa Debit. Permanent TSB withdrew Laser cards and began to replace them with Visa Debit cards in September 2010.

In the end of October 2010, Bank of Ireland announced they were ceasing their involvement in the partnership in 2011.

On 9 February 2011, EBS Building Society said that it would issue MasterCard debit cards instead of Laser from the second half of 2011.

In July 2011, AIB announced that it would cease issuing Laser cards from 2011, leaving National Irish Bank as the final issuer in the Laser card system, leading to speculation that the scheme would close in 2012. It was reported that banks were turning away from Laser because of some difficulties encountered by consumers in making online purchases.

However, customers began to complain almost immediately about numerous difficulties caused by the premature withdrawal of Laser cards. Some retailers who were able to give cashback on Laser cards were unwilling or unable to do so on the replacement cards; Permanent TSB issued a second replacement Visa Debit card to its customers in April 2011 due to the initial replacement chip and some older terminals not being compatible (resulting in refusal of cashback).

Other retailers who had been charged a small flat-rate per-transaction fee for Laser transactions found that they were charged a percentage of the value of the transaction for the replacement cards. Organisations such as Betfair which did not charge customers for Laser card transactions began to charge these customers 1.5% commission on transactions using the replacement Visa Debit cards.

Merchant services companies did not advertise whether there were any differences in their charges for the two types of debit card. Some customers reported being charged foreign transaction fees on Visa Debit cards in Northern Ireland, which had not been charged on the old cards.

=== Website and e-commerce system gateways ===
Ogone, ICEPAY, WorldPay, Netbanx.com, Moneybookers.com, CreditCall, DataCash, Realex, TNS and SagePay provided Laser payment gateways.

== See also ==
- List of Irish companies
