= Debit Mastercard =

Debit card

- Product type: Debit card
- Current owner: Mastercard Inc.
- Country: United States
- Related brands: Mastercard Maestro
- Markets: Worldwide
- Tagline: "Start Something Priceless"
- Website: www.mastercard.com

Debit Mastercard is a brand of debit cards provided by Mastercard. They use the same systems as standard Mastercard credit cards but they do not use a line of credit to the customer, instead relying on funds that the customer has in their bank account.

== Availability ==
=== Algeria ===
Several banks offer Credit and Debit Mastercard in Algeria (Algeria Gulf Bank, Banque de Développement Local, Crédit Populaire Agricole).

=== Argentina ===
In 2011, Banco de Córdoba started offering Debit Mastercard to its clients, as a direct competitor to the Visa Débito card. However, this would not be a direct replacement of all Maestro cards in the Argentine market, since it will be analyzed with each bank.

=== Australia ===
In Australia, the Debit Mastercard is the main competitor to the Visa Debit cards provided by Visa Inc.

The Debit Mastercard was first launched in Australia by Westpac in 2006 as an alternative card for the bank's Cirrus cardholders.

=== Baltic states ===
Swedbank has offered Debit Mastercard in Estonia since 2011, Latvia and Lithuania since 2012. Nordea has offered Debit Mastercard in Latvia since 2016. SEB has offered Debit Mastercard and Visa Debit for years equally in the Baltic states, but since March/April 2014 SEB decided to prefer Debit Mastercard as their main debit card, still somewhat offering also Visa Debit.

=== Canada ===
Debit Mastercard was launched in Canada in July 2016 with Bank of Montreal. Similar to most Canadian Visa Debit cards, BMO's Debit Mastercard is co-badged with Interac and operates solely over that network for point-of-sale transactions in Canada, but uses the Mastercard network for Internet and international transactions.

=== Germany ===
Deutsche Bank, Commerzbank, Norisbank, Consors Finanz, MLP, netbank, KT Bank, O2 Banking, Fidor Bank and N26 offer the Debit Mastercard to their customers. In Germany, the Debit Mastercard is a competitor to the national Girocard.

=== Greece ===
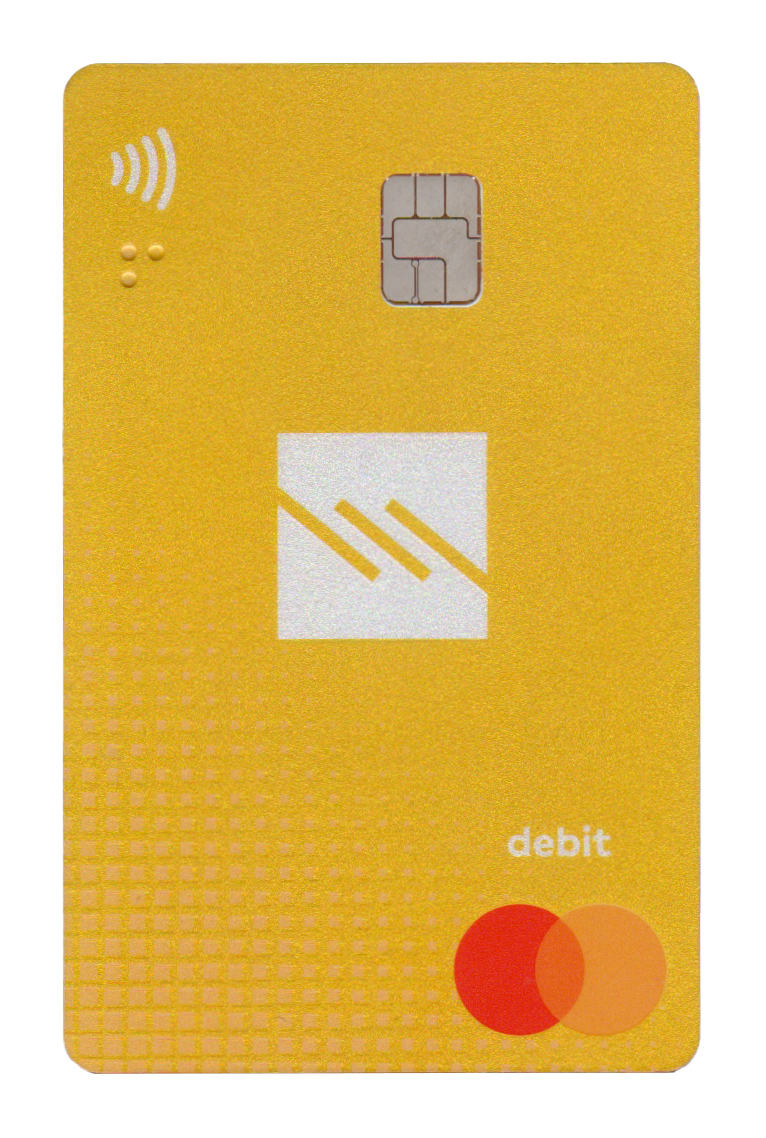
Piraeus Bank Debit Mastercard

As of March 2015, all four major Greek banks offer a contactless Debit Mastercard to their clients.

Eurobank Ergasias is replacing its Maestro line of debit cards with a new Debit Mastercard.

The National Bank of Greece (NBG) started replacing its Maestro debit card with a new Debit Mastercard in March 2015. NBG is the last one of the four major Greek banks to offer a Debit Mastercard to its customers, and like Eurobank it only offers this debit card.

The other two major Greek banks offer Debit Mastercard cards as well, but not exclusively. Piraeus Bank has added the option for a Mastercard Debit card alongside the Visa Debit (formerly Visa Electron) card that it had been offering in the past as the exclusive option. Also Alpha Bank offers Debit Mastercard and Debit Mastercard Contactless as one of three options for a debit card. It is not clear which debit card these two banks promote the most to customers that do not have a specific preference.

=== Hong Kong ===
As of March 2026, HSBC, Citibank, Standard Chartered, WeLab Bank, Livi Bank & Mox Bank offer a contactless Debit Mastercard to their clients in virtual and/or physical plastic card.

=== Indonesia ===
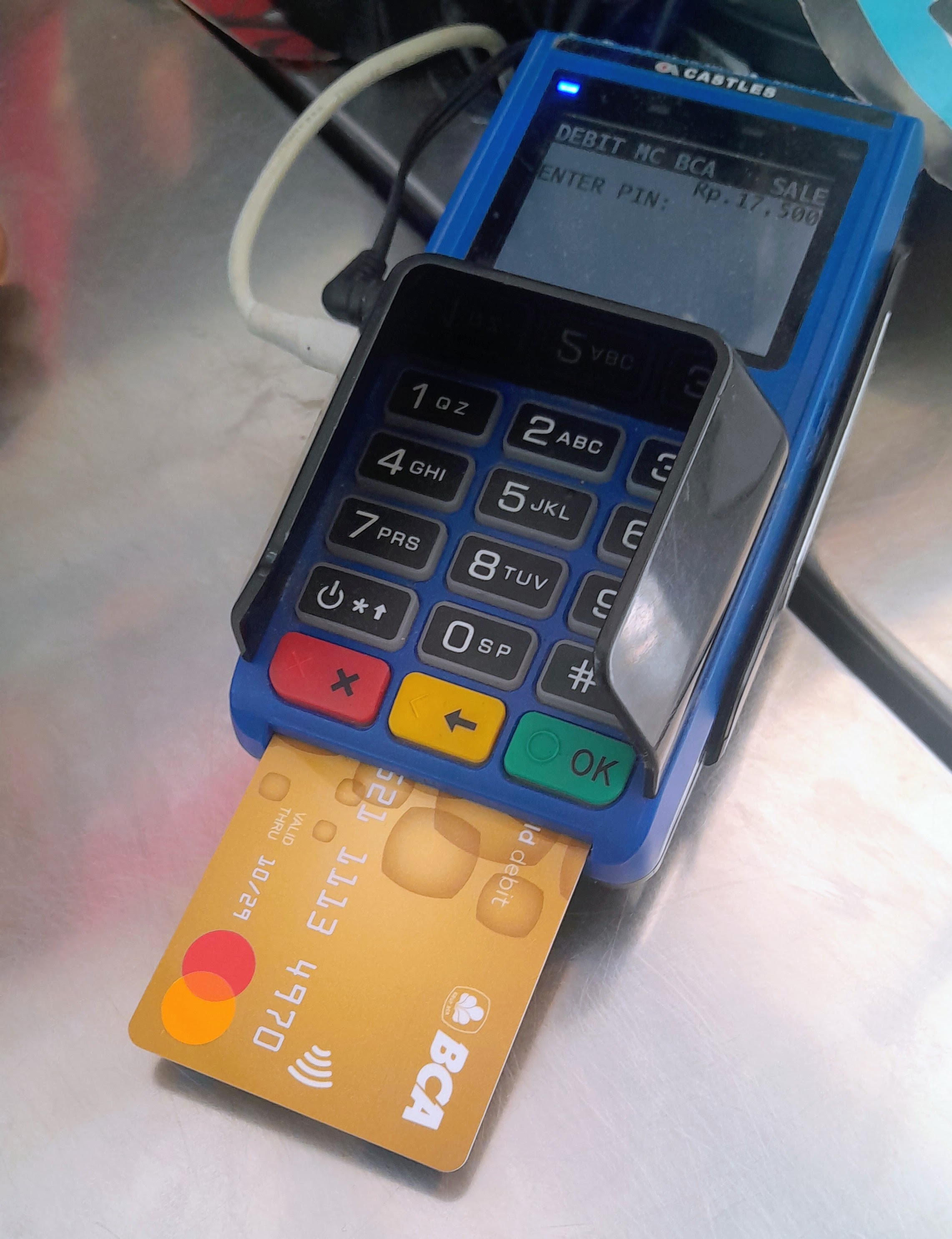
Castles Technology payment terminal with BCA Debit Mastercard inserted

In Indonesia, banks such as Bank Central Asia (BCA), CIMB Niaga, OCBC Indonesia, and Bank Danamon offer contactless Debit Mastercard to their customers alongside national debit card scheme under Gerbang Pembayaran Nasional (GPN; National Payment Gateway) network. Debit Mastercard competes with Visa Debit for international debit card schemes.

=== Netherlands ===
bunq bank issues a Debit Mastercard to its premium customers. Additionally, ICS issues MasterCard and VISA debit cards including 180-day insurance, which is normally not available on debit cards in the Netherlands.

Rabobank will start offering Debit Mastercards from mid-2022, alongside their existing Visa Debit cards. ING has also begun rolling out Debit Mastercards, which will gradually replace their current stock of V-PAY and Maestro cards. The full rollout of Debit Mastercards by ING is expected to take place in 2024.

=== Philippines ===
Major banks like BDO, Metrobank (with Maestro), Security Bank, RCBC, BPI and PNB (with Maestro) issues Debit Mastercard.

Debit Cards like Mastercard are also accepted in most Point of sales in the Philippines. It directly competes with Visa Debit which is mostly issued by state-owned banks and Bancnet the national interbank network

=== Romania ===
In Romania the Debit Mastercard is one of the two popular options of debit cards - the other one being Visa Debit.

=== United Kingdom ===
In the United Kingdom, the Debit Mastercard operates alongside Mastercard's established Maestro debit card scheme, which previously were the only debit cards provided by Mastercard. However, almost all providers have switched to issuing Debit Mastercard instead, as the previous Maestro debit cards are not accepted as widely worldwide, unlike the Debit Mastercard which is accepted worldwide wherever Mastercard is accepted. Although, currently, the Maestro scheme still remains in place. The main issuers of Debit Mastercard are Virgin Money (incorporating Clydesdale Bank and Yorkshire Bank), Danske Bank, Metro Bank, Monzo Bank, Santander UK, Starling Bank, Chase UK, and Thinkmoney. First Direct began switching existing customers to Debit Mastercard from Visa in 2021.

NatWest Group began switching existing customers to and providing new customers with a Debit Mastercard in 2022.

The Debit Mastercard is a competitor to the Visa Debit cards provided by Visa Inc.

=== United States ===
In the United States, unlike Australia and the United Kingdom, three levels of Debit Mastercard are available: Standard, Enhanced, and World. In 2012, there were four levels of Debit Mastercard available: Standard, Gold, Platinum and World.

== See also ==
- E-commerce credit card payment system
- Payment card
- Payment service provider
- Wire transfer
