= Zolotaya Korona =

Brand of Russian payment system

- Operating area: Russia, CIS, Europe
- Members: 550
- Founded: 1994
- Website: https://koronapay.com/

Zolotaya Korona (brand KoronaPay) is a Russian payment system offering various services to individuals through its own online platforms and those of its partners, including banks and retail chains. These services include cash-to-cash transfers, online card-to-cash transfers, online card-to-card transfers, and online and offline loan repayment in the partner network service points.

The Zolotaya Korona payment system was registered by the Bank of Russia in accordance with the requirements of the Federal Law "On the National Payment System" of 20 December 2012 (registration certificate No. 0012). It is included in the register of payment system operators available on the Central Bank website.

Zolotaya Korona was included in the Register of Russia's Socially Significant Payment Systems from 24 September 2013 to 25 March 2021 and was also recognized as a significant payment system by the National Bank of the Republic of Kazakhstan.

Zolotaya Korona's turnover totaled over 1 trillion rubles in 2020.

== History ==
The company's first project, the Zolotaya Korona Bank Card service, was launched at the end of 1993 in Akademgorodok, Novosibirsk. In 1994, the first in-service transaction by microprocessor card in the Zolotaya Korona system was carried out.

In 2003, the company introduced a new service for individuals: instant money transfers.

Beyond its payment system, the company has developed projects in transportation and social services, including the Zolotaya Korona Transport Card, Zolotaya Korona Social Card, and the Zolotaya Korona Loan Repayment service, among others.

In October 2012, the activities of Zolotaya Korona in Armenia were terminated due to restricted access to the transfer system between branches of Armenian banks.

In 2013, the Central Bank of the Russian Federation recognized Zolotaya Korona as a socially significant payment system.

In January 2014, the 13 biggest banks in Azerbaijan ceased providing services through the Zolotaya Korona system. The decision to refuse to cooperate with the service was made due to the low profitability of operations.

In 2014, Zolotaya Korona was considered as a technology provider for the creation of the National Payment System, but was not selected.

In October 2016, the system was placed on Ukraine's sanctions list. Its operation in the territory of Ukraine is prohibited.

In February 2017, Zolotaya Korona was included in the register of socially significant payment systems in the Republic of Kazakhstan.

In 2018, Zolotaya Korona was recognized as the best money transfer system not requiring opening an account, based on the results of cross-industry research of the payment market "Money transfers of individuals in Russia 2018", conducted by Frank RG.

On 1 March 2021, MoneyGram, an American cross-border money transfer system, ceased providing services directly to individuals in Russia. Sending money transfers from Russia to abroad became impossible, and receiving cash sent by MoneyGram clients to Russia from other countries was only available at the Zolotaya Korona payment system service points.

In February 2022, the service banned all transfers related to cryptocurrency, including trading.
