= Visa Debit =

Debit card

- Product type: Debit card
- Current owner: Visa Inc.
- Country: United States
- Related brands: Visa Electron
- Markets: Worldwide
- Tagline: "Everywhere You Want To Be"
- Website: www.visa.com

Visa Debit is a brand of debit card issued by Visa in many countries. Numerous banks and financial institutions issue Visa Debit cards to their customers for access to their bank accounts. In many countries the Visa Debit functionality is often incorporated on the same plastic card that allows access to ATM and any domestic networks like EFTPOS or Interac.

== Usage ==
In many countries the Visa Debit functionality has been added to payment cards, to allow customers to use the card for payments on the internet, point of sale transactions and access to ATMs.

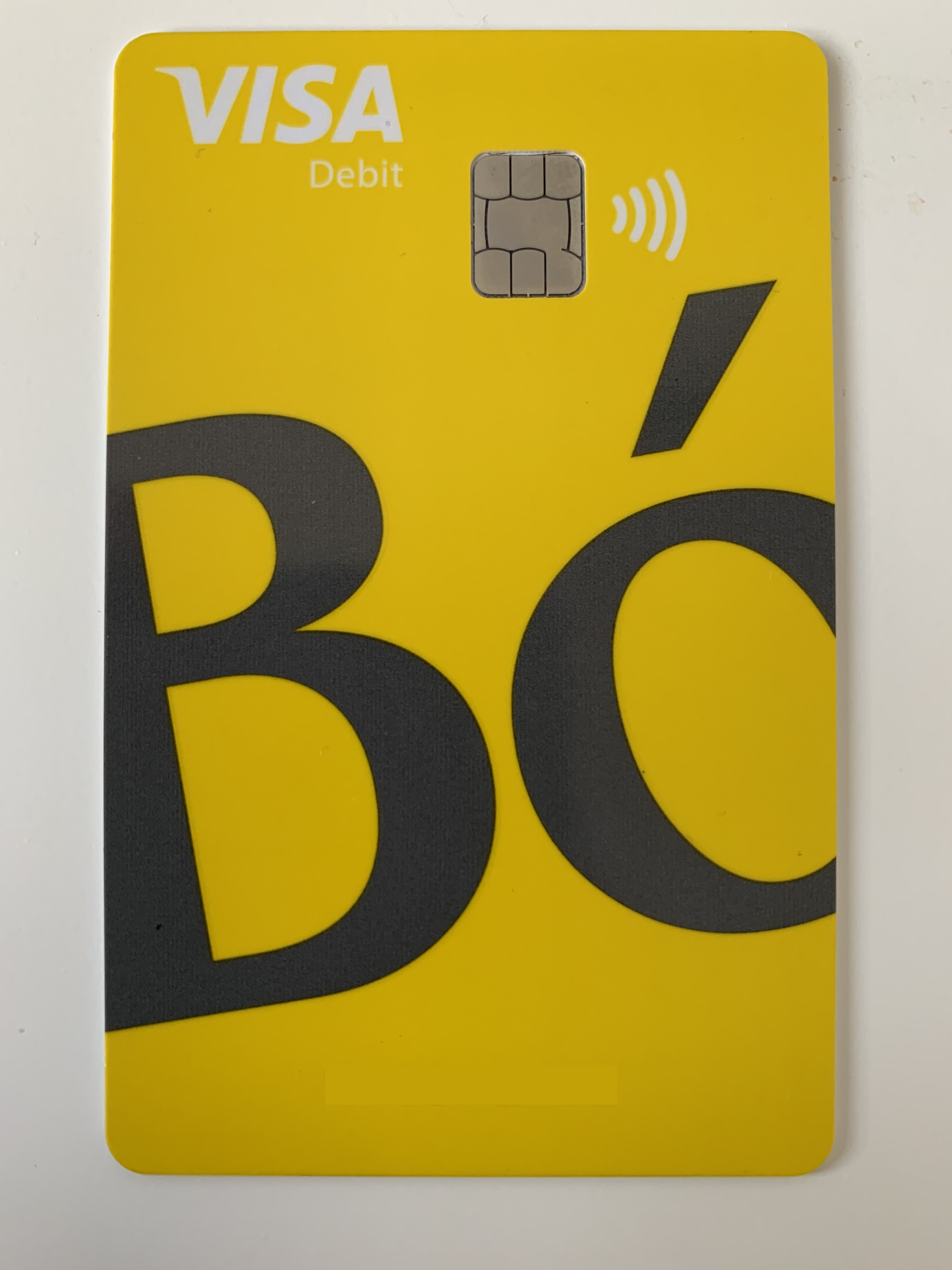
Bó bank Visa Debit card

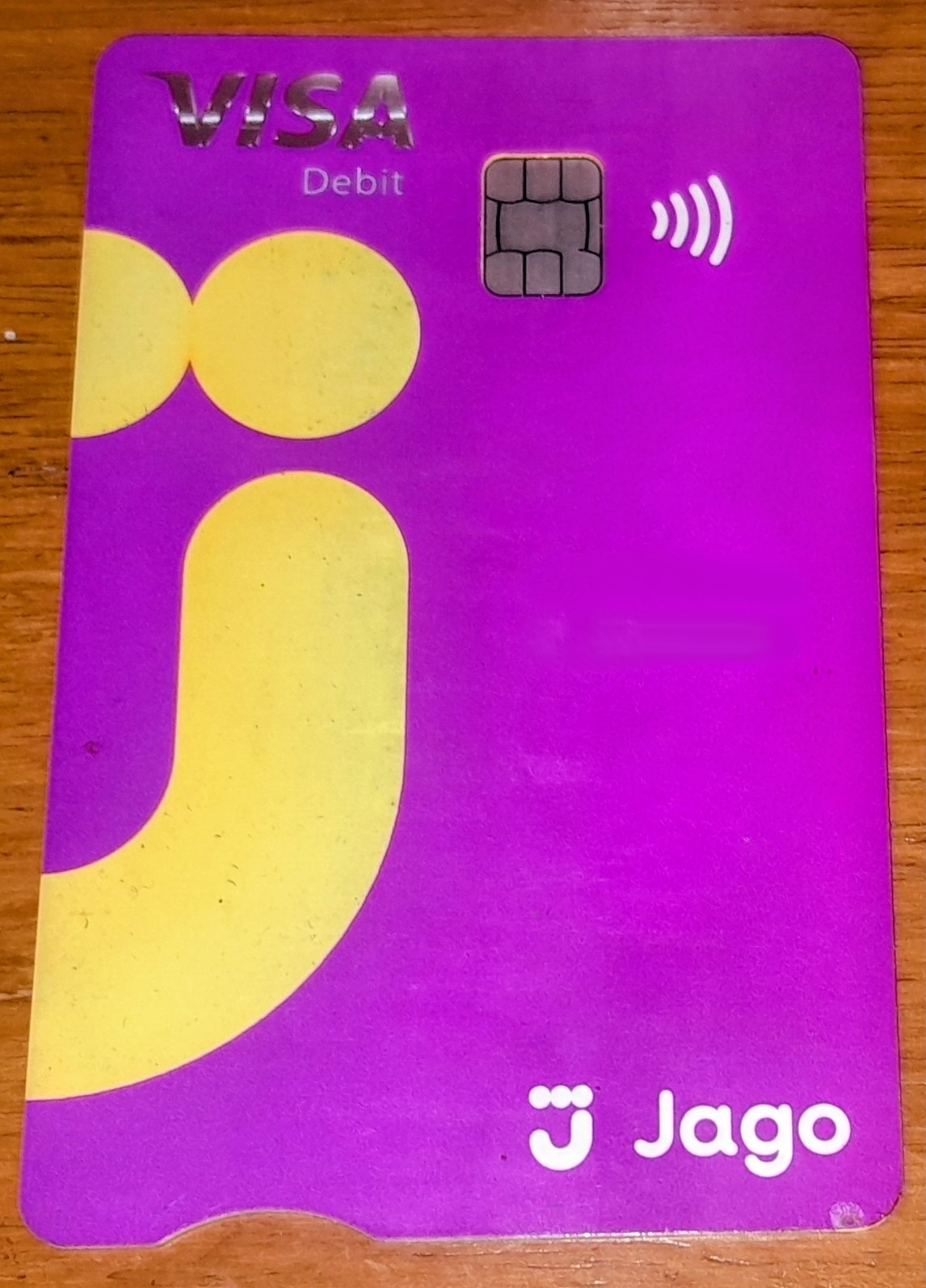
Bank Jago Visa Debit card

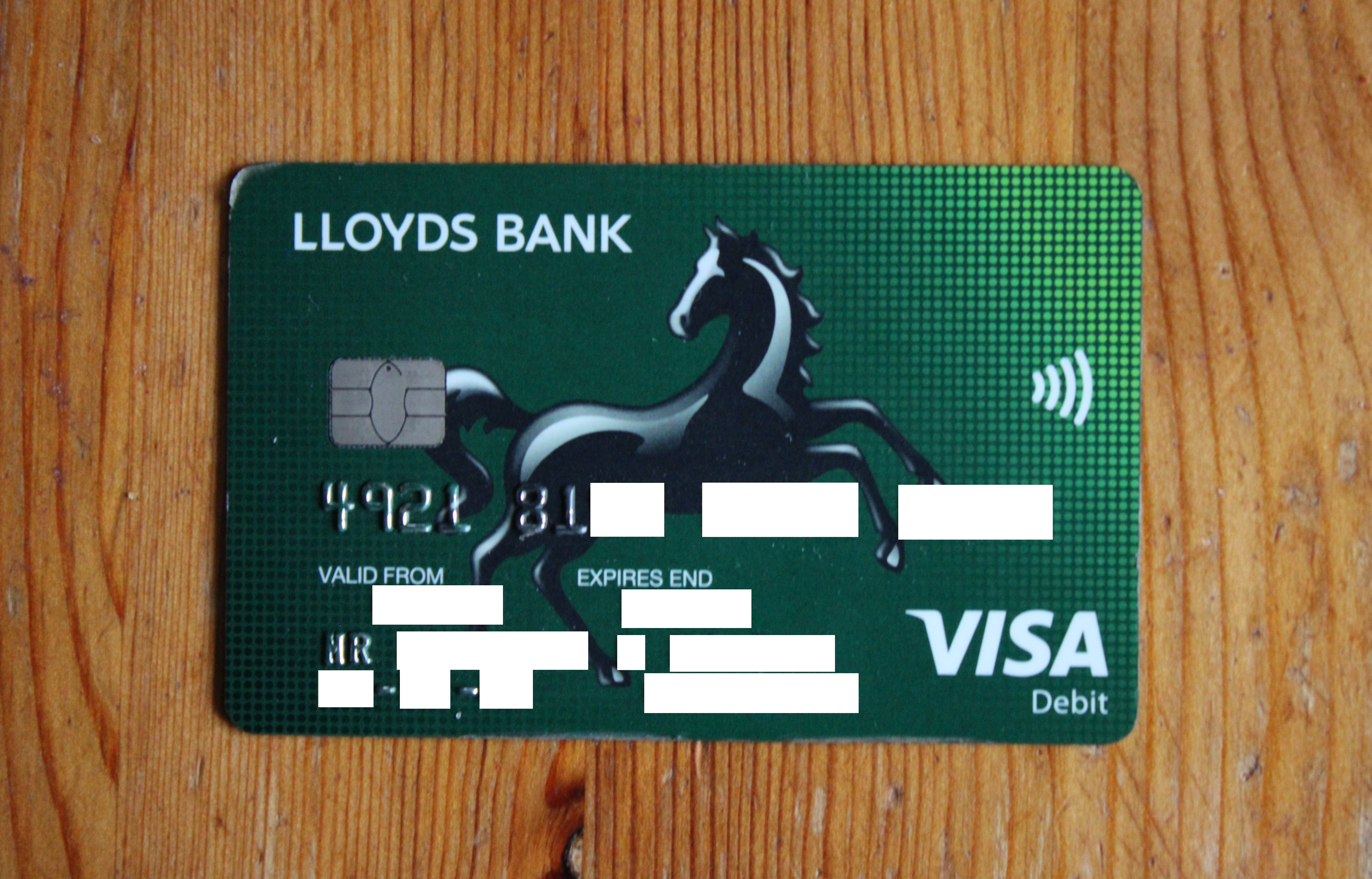
Lloyds Bank Visa Debit card

=== Australia ===
Bendigo Bank issued the first Visa Debit card in 1982, more than two decades before Debit Mastercard, or widespread Visa Debit use in Australia. Today it is in wide issuance, and domestically switches over local networks, though for new banks, connection to Visa is permitted.

=== Canada ===
In Canada, virtually all domestic debit card transactions are processed over the Interac network, though several financial institutions have also permitted PIN-based ATM transactions internationally over the Visa-owned Plus Network. However, Interac's dominance has left little room for alternative debit networks such as Visa or Mastercard to be used for domestic transactions.

Several Canadian financial institutions that primarily offer credit cards through the Visa network – including CIBC, RBC, Scotiabank, and TD – currently offer Visa Debit, either through a dual-network co-badged card which also works on Interac (CIBC, Scotia and TD), or as a "virtual" card used alongside the customer's existing Interac debit card (RBC). Both options ensure customers can perform point-of-sale transactions or ATM withdrawals as usual via Interac, but use the Visa network to process online, phone, and international transactions, none of which are well-supported by Interac. (The latter did have its own online payment service, Interac Online, which co-badged Visa cards were not eligible for. Interac Online was discontinued on October 31, 2024.)

For the dual-network cards, in-person transactions within Canada are processed on the Interac network, but international transactions, as well as online and phone orders through Canadian retailers, are processed through the Visa network. (However, Canadian retailers must specifically allow for Visa Debit transactions, even if they already accept Visa credit cards.) "Virtual Visa Debit" works similarly; customers use their existing Interac debit cards for in-person transactions (and Interac Online) in Canada, but are also provided with a secondary "virtual" Visa card (i.e. card number, expiry, and CVV2) which can be used for online and phone transactions (but not point-of-sale, in Canada or internationally).

Although Visa floated the prospect of competing directly with Interac in regards to point-of-sale transactions in 2009, there has been no indication since 2010 that it is continuing to pursue this option.

=== Germany ===
Germany's banking industry strongly favours its domestic girocard scheme that can be co-badged with Maestro or V-Pay for many years already, but only from recently also with the more powerful Debit Mastercard (since 2020) or Visa Debit (since 2023).

=== Greece ===
In Greece, Piraeus Bank and Alpha Bank offer Visa Debit cards to their customers as an option, having updated from the Visa Electron cards that they used to offer.

=== Indonesia ===
In Indonesia, banks such as Bank Mandiri, Bank Syariah Indonesia, and Bank Jago offer Visa Debit cards to their customers alongside national debit card under Gerbang Pembayaran Nasional (GPN; National Payment Gateway) network. Visa Debit competes with Debit Mastercard for international debit card networks.

=== Ireland ===
Many Irish banks, such as Permanent TSB, are now issuing Visa Debit cards to their current account customers as the domestic Laser scheme, usually co-badged with Maestro, was abandoned in the early 2010s.

=== Israel ===
In Israel, Visa Debit only launched in April 2015, and is only offered to Bank Leumi customers via its subsidiary Leumi Card, now MAX. The bank used to issue debit cards under the Visa Electron brand prior to losing its controlling interest at ICC Also Known As Cal credit company on 2000.

=== Italy ===
In Italy the first Visa Debit branded card was issued by FinecoBank as their default option for debit cards, starting from 2016. All new customers cards (and cards due to renewal) will be replaced by a Visa Debit card co-badged with the national Bancomat network.

=== Netherlands ===
Banks offer Maestro and V Pay debit cards, but no Visa Debit cards. Visa has announced that Rabobank will start offering Visa Debit cards from mid-2022. ING has also announced it will issue Visa Debit cards, which will be gradually introduced as their current stock of V-PAY and Maestro cards is depleted. The widespread rollout of these Visa Debit cards is expected to begin in 2025.

=== Philippines ===
In the Philippines, major banks like BDO, Unionbank, Landbank, EastWest Bank, UCPB and DBP are the major issuers of Visa Debit. All of the three major state-owned banks issue Visa debit cards as well their subsidiaries like the Overseas Filipino Bank.

Most Visa Debit cards are connected to the national interbank network BancNet and is the primary network for most over-the-counter transaction.

=== Romania ===
The Visa Debit are - along with Debit Mastercard - the most issued debit cards in Romania.

Visa entered the Romanian market in 1996 (26 years ago); the first debit cards issued by Visa in Romania were Visa Electron, but most of them were replaced by Visa Debit and its variant Visa Classic.

=== United Kingdom ===
Visa Debit was formerly called Visa Delta solely in the United Kingdom.

The first debit card in the United Kingdom was launched by Barclays in June 1987 under the "Connect" brand. NatWest followed with the "Switch" debit card in October 1988. Connect was later merged into Visa.

The Visa Debit card was previously known as "Visa Delta" solely in the UK. The Delta name began to be phased out in favor of the Visa Debit branding from September 1998.

=== United States ===
Numerous banks issue Visa-branded debit cards linked to accounts. Some issuing banks call their cards "Visa check cards". Cards allow for purchases at any merchant where any type of Visa card is accepted. Transactions are processed one of three ways. A signed transaction is processed through the regular Visa credit network. PIN-based transactions, including ATM withdrawals, are processed through the Visa-owned Plus, Interlink networks or other regional networks such as STAR. Many retailers allow cashback with PIN-based transactions. Also, in line with other credit and debit purchases, transactions under $25 are exempt from requiring signatures or PINs.

== Market competition ==
Among competitors to Visa Debit in the debit card market are Debit Mastercard cards as well as local domestic debit cards. In addition to the above, China's UnionPay, India's RuPay, and Japan's JCB Co., Ltd. are competitive as well. In a few countries, such as the United States, American Express is still another competitor.
