= Gerbang Pembayaran Nasional =

Indonesian electronic payment service provider

Logo of the GPN

Gerbang Pembayaran Nasional (GPN) is an interbank network in Indonesia initiated by Bank Indonesia. GPN is a system consisting of standards, switching, and services built through a set of rules and mechanisms to integrate various instruments and payment channels nationwide. Launched on 4 December 2017, in Jakarta through Bank Indonesia Regulation No.19/8/PBI/2017 and the Regulation of Members of the Board of Governors No.19/10/PADG/2017 regarding Gerbang Pembayaran Nasional (National Payment Gateway), GPN localises the banking payment system in Indonesia which was previously concentrated on multinational payment card services corporations such as Visa and Mastercard.

GPN is integrated with national QR code payment standard QRIS and interbank transfer standard BI-Fast.

It is mandatory for banking customers in Indonesia to have at least one GPN card for domestic offline transactions.

== Background and establishment ==
Before the establishment of GPN, Indonesia's retail payment infrastructure was characterised by separate payment networks with limited interconnection and interoperability. Bank Indonesia identified this fragmentation as an obstacle to creating an integrated national retail payment ecosystem and subsequently developed GPN together with the domestic payment-system industry.

Bank Indonesia issued Regulation No. 19/8/PBI/2017 concerning the National Payment Gateway in 2017. The regulation established GPN policy through the interconnection of switching networks in order to create interoperability within the national payment system. Detailed implementation provisions were subsequently established through Regulation of Members of the Board of Governors No. 19/10/PADG/2017, which took effect on 20 September 2017.

GPN was formally launched in Jakarta on 4 December 2017. At its launch, Bank Indonesia described three principal objectives: establishing an interconnected and interoperable payment ecosystem capable of domestic authorisation, clearing and settlement; strengthening consumer protection and the security of transaction data; and simplifying connections between participants in the national payment infrastructure.

The framework was also intended to allow payment instruments issued by one participating institution to be used through infrastructure operated by another participant. Bank Indonesia described this principle at the launch as enabling transactions across different banks, instruments and payment channels.

== Objectives and scope ==
According to Bank Indonesia, GPN is intended to establish interconnected and shared payment infrastructure, strengthen the role of the domestic payment-system industry, expand the availability of retail payment products and services, improve transaction security and consumer protection, and organise the institutions responsible for standardisation, switching and services.

The scope of GPN covers domestic payment transactions through three principal forms of interoperability: interconnection between switching networks; interconnection and interoperability of payment channels; and interoperability of payment instruments.

Payment channels within its scope include automated teller machines (ATMs), electronic data capture (EDC) terminals, agents, payment gateways, QRIS and other payment channels. Payment instruments include ATM and debit cards, credit cards, electronic money and other payment instruments.

Bank Indonesia also designed GPN to support public-sector and retail-payment programmes, including non-cash distribution of social assistance, public-to-government payments, electronic toll-road payments, electronic payments for transport systems, domestic electronic commerce, and financial inclusion.

== Organisation ==
GPN is organised around three institutional functions: the Standard Agency (Lembaga Standar), Switching Agencies (Lembaga Switching), and the Services Agency (Lembaga Services).

=== Standard Agency ===
The Standard Agency is responsible for preparing, developing and managing standards required for the interconnection and interoperability of payment instruments, payment channels and switching infrastructure, including related security standards.

Bank Indonesia designated the Indonesian Payment System Association (Asosiasi Sistem Pembayaran Indonesia, ASPI) as the Standard Agency for GPN.

=== Switching Agencies ===
Switching Agencies process domestic payment-transaction data and provide the switching infrastructure required for interconnection and interoperability between participants.

Bank Indonesia lists four GPN Switching Agencies: PT Artajasa Pembayaran Elektronis, PT Rintis Sejahtera, PT Alto Network and PT Jalin Pembayaran Nusantara.

Under the original GPN regulatory framework, a Switching Agency was required to process domestic payment transactions using infrastructure located in Indonesia and to satisfy requirements concerning ownership, technical capacity and capital.

=== Services Agency ===
The Services Agency performs functions associated with transaction security and customer-data confidentiality, reconciliation, clearing and settlement, fraud prevention, risk management and mitigation, and the handling of payment-transaction disputes for consumer protection.

The Services Agency function is performed by PT Penyelesaian Transaksi Elektronik Nasional (PTEN). PTEN was established following cooperation between major Indonesian banks and the switching institutions participating in GPN. The consortium agreement establishing the Services Agency was signed during the launch of GPN in December 2017.

== Connected participants ==
Institutions connected to GPN include issuers, acquirers, payment-gateway operators and other parties determined by Bank Indonesia.

The original regulatory framework required connected parties to comply with standards established by Bank Indonesia and managed by the Standard Agency, as well as requirements established by the Services Agency. Switching Agencies and the Services Agency are also required to conduct final settlement through Bank Indonesia.

For ATM and debit-card services, commercial banks and Islamic commercial banks were required under the initial implementation framework to connect to at least two GPN Switching Agencies by 30 June 2018.

== Domestic transaction processing ==
A central feature of GPN is domestic processing of payment transactions. Bank Indonesia defines a domestic payment transaction in this context as a transaction using a payment instrument issued by an Indonesian issuer and conducted within the territory of Indonesia. Such transactions are required to be processed through GPN.

The domestic-processing requirement was introduced as part of the broader effort to integrate domestic payment channels and infrastructure and to increase interoperability between previously separate networks.

== GPN debit cards ==
Bank Indonesia and the Indonesian banking industry formally introduced debit cards carrying the GPN logo on 3 May 2018. Cards carrying the national logo were designed to operate across domestic ATM and merchant payment-terminal networks participating in GPN.

The national branding does not prevent banks from issuing cards connected to international payment networks. At the launch of GPN, Bank Indonesia stated that the national-logo debit card was intended to increase domestic acceptance without eliminating payment instruments bearing international network logos.

Bank Indonesia describes national branding as a set of rules concerning the GPN logo, nationwide acceptance and domestic processing. Institutions connected to GPN are required to apply the national logo to payment instruments covered by the relevant GPN requirements.

== Pricing ==
Bank Indonesia establishes pricing policies within GPN to support interoperability while taking into account payment acceptance, efficiency, competition, innovation, risk management and reasonable infrastructure cost recovery.

For debit-card merchant transactions, GPN uses a merchant discount rate (MDR). Bank Indonesia distinguishes between on-us transactions, in which the issuer and acquirer are the same institution, and off-us transactions, in which they are different institutions.

Bank Indonesia's published GPN pricing schedule specifies an MDR of 0.15 per cent for regular on-us debit-card merchant transactions. For off-us transactions, the schedule specifies 1 per cent for regular merchants, 0.75 per cent for education merchants and 0.5 per cent for petrol stations. Government-to-person, person-to-government and donation transactions have a zero per cent MDR under the published schedule.

== Development within Indonesia's payment-system architecture ==
GPN subsequently became part of the broader architecture described in Bank Indonesia's Indonesia Payment Systems Blueprint 2025. The blueprint places GPN within the national retail-payment infrastructure alongside systems including BI-FAST and other payment-system infrastructure.

The blueprint envisaged greater integration between payment interfaces, domestic switching infrastructure and real-time retail-payment infrastructure. In this architecture, GPN provides part of the domestic infrastructure for interoperability, while BI-FAST was subsequently developed by Bank Indonesia as a retail-payment infrastructure supporting real-time transfers available 24 hours a day and seven days a week.

QRIS, Indonesia's national standard for payments using QR codes, was introduced separately by Bank Indonesia in 2019. Bank Indonesia's current description of the GPN infrastructure includes QRIS among the payment channels within the scope of GPN interoperability.

The regulatory framework surrounding GPN was subsequently incorporated into Bank Indonesia's broader regulation of payment-system infrastructure. Bank Indonesia Regulation No. 23/7/PBI/2021 on Payment System Infrastructure continued to provide for GPN policy through switching interconnection and national payment-system interoperability.

== See also ==
- Economy of Indonesia
