= ATM Bersama =

Indonesian interbank network

- Operating area: Indonesia
- ATMs: 49,000
- Founded: 1993

ATM Bersama (lit. 'Common ATMs') is an interbank network in Indonesia, connecting the ATM networks of twenty-one banks. It was established 1993 and is based on the model adopted by MegaLink, an interbank network in the Philippines.

ATM Bersama has over 70 members with 17,000 ATMs throughout Indonesia. The network is owned by PT Artajasa Pembayaran Elektronis.

== Services ==
ATM Bersama provides many interbank facilities, including balance inquiry, cash withdrawal and real time-online transfer to other accounts of members of the shared network. In 2004, ARTAJASA made a cross-border ATM Bersama with partner provider MEPS, Malaysia. Singapore and Thailand have been linked to the ATM Bersama network with NETS and ITMX respectively.

== Members ==
Former logo of ATM Bersama, used until December 16, 2015

The following banks are the members of ATM Bersama network:

- ANZ
- Bank Agroniaga
- Bank Jago Tbk.
- Bank Bengkulu
- Bank Bukopin
- Bank Capital
- Commonwealth Bank
- Bank DKI
- Bank Ganesha
- Bank HSBC
- Bank Ina Perdana
- Bank Index
- Bank Jabar Banten
- Bank Jambi
- Bank Jateng
- Bank Jatim
- Bank Kalbar
- Bank Kalsel
- Bank Kaltim
- Bank Kesawan
- Bank Kesejahteraan
- Bank Lampung
- Bank Maluku
- Bank Mayapada Internasional
- Bank Maybank Indonesia
- Bank Mayora
- Bank Mega
- Bank Mega Syariah
- Bank Mestika
- Bank Muamalat
- Bank Mutiara
- Bank Nagari
- Bank NTB
- Bank NTT
- Bank Nusantara Parahyangan
- Bank Panin
- Bank Papua
- Bank Pundi Indonesia
- Bank Riau Kepri
- Bank Saudara
- Bank Sinarmas
- Bank Sulsel
- Bank Sulteng
- Bank Sultra
- Bank SulutGo
- Bank Sumsel Babel
- Bank Sumut
- Bank Swadesi
- Bank Syariah Mandiri
- Bank Negara Indonesia (BNI)
- BPD Aceh
- BPD Bali
- BPD DIY
- BPD Kalteng
- BPR KS
- BPR SJ
- Bank Rakyat Indonesia (BRI)
- BRI Syariah
- BTN
- BTPN
- CIMB Niaga
- Citibank
- Bank Danamon
- ICB Bumiputera
- Bank Mandiri
- OCBC NISP
- Bank Permata
- RBS
- Standard Chartered
- UOB Indonesia

== See also ==
- MegaLink
- ATM usage fees

=== Indonesian interbank networks ===
- ALTO
- PRIMA
- ATM Link
