= Yucho =

- Operating area: Japan
- Members: 1 (130 affiliated)
- ATMs: 26,519
- Founded: 1979

Yucho (ゆうちょ, Yūcho) is an interbank network in Japan, owned and operated by the postal savings division of Japan Post Bank. It counts some 26,519 ATMs, of which 23,500 are at post offices and 2,869 are away from post offices. The number of ATMs correspond to about one for every post office in Japan, excluding a few post offices that are too small to support ATMs. It is one of the first interbank networks, having been set up in 1979.

Some 130 banks in Japan have access to the Yucho network and vice versa. However, rather than being members of Yucho, they are affiliates of the network. The network was set up primarily for Japan Post's postal finance systems, which include its savings accounts. Yucho ATMs are also linked internationally to the Cirrus, China UnionPay and PLUS interbank networks, and also accept Visa, MasterCard, American Express, Diners Club, Japan Credit Bureau and China UnionPay credit cards through those networks.

Yucho ATMs are categorized into two kinds: actual ATMs, which can accept passbooks to make deposits or withdrawals in addition to ATM cards, and cash dispensers, which only accept ATM cards. Unlike most interbank networks, Yucho ATMs do not operate 24 hours a day. Some ATMs close as early as 5:00 pm JST and as late as 11:00 pm JST.
