= TYME =

ATM/interbank network in Wisconsin and the Upper Peninsula of Michigan

- Operating area: Wisconsin, Minnesota, Illinois, Florida, and Michigan
- ATMs: ±27,000 (2004)
- Founded: 1975; 51 years ago
- Defunct: 2002; 24 years ago
- Website: Archived website

TYME ("Take Your Money Everywhere") is an ATM/interbank network in Florida, Wisconsin, and the Upper Peninsula of Michigan. It was one of the first shared EFT networks in the country.

Residents commonly referred to ATMs as a "TYME machine", which resulted in confusion when Wisconsinites visiting unfamiliar areas would ask the locals where they could find a "time machine".

== History ==
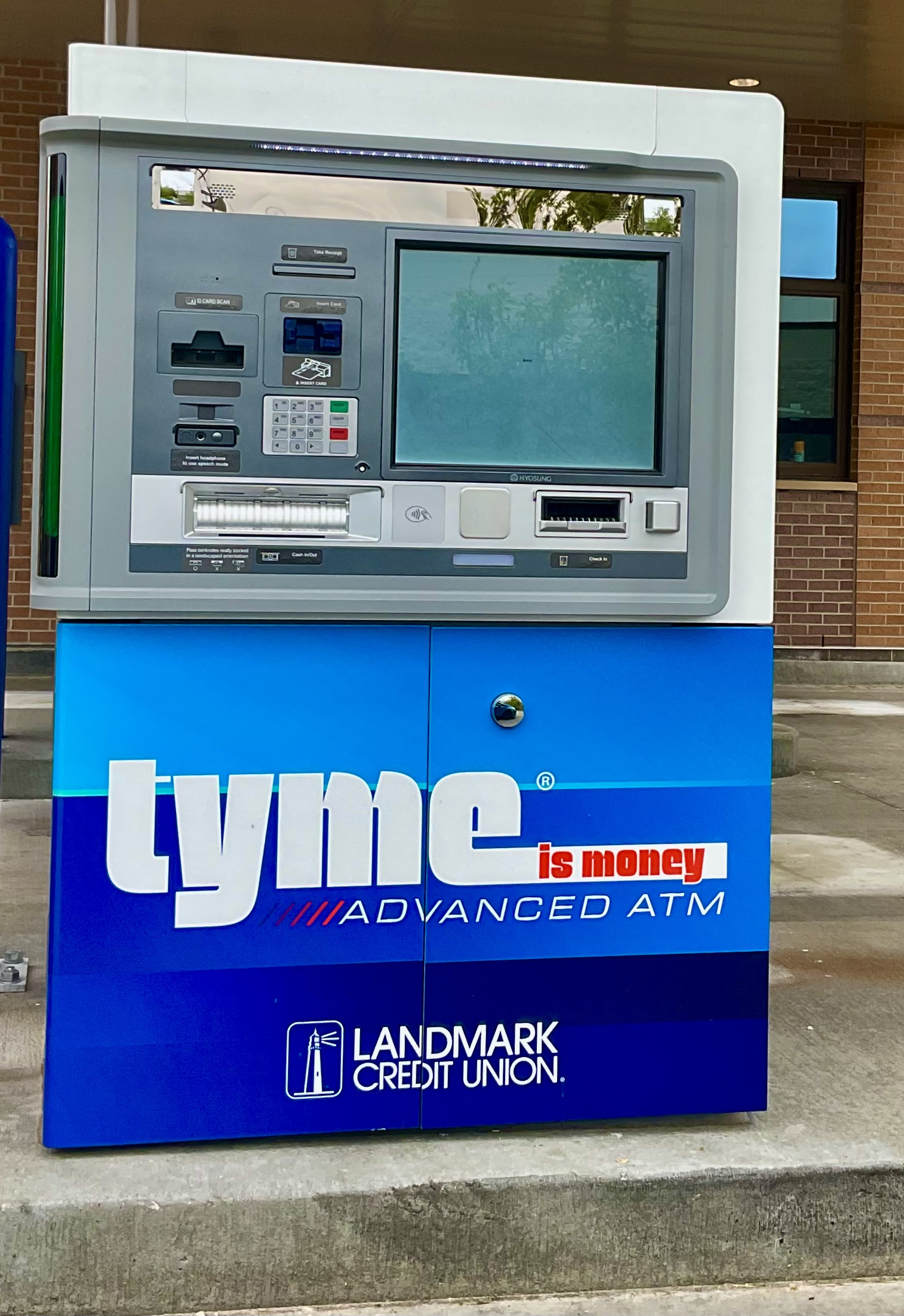
A modern "TYME machine" ATM at a Landmark Credit Union branch in Greenfield, Wisconsin.

In 1975, the TYME network was created by an agreement among First Wisconsin National Bank, Marshall & Ilsley, Marine Bank of Milwaukee, and Midland National Bank.

In 2002, the TYME network merged with the Pulse network, taking the Pulse brand name in 2004 and retiring the old TYME identity.

As of the 2010s, the combined Pulse/TYME network included about 81,000 ATMs and 457,000 merchant point-of-sale locations. For the purposes of familiarity, some bank locations retained the former slot for the TYME signage and use a replacement slide with "ATM" rendered in the Neil Bold font used by TYME.

In 2022, Wisconsin-based Landmark Credit Union convinced Pulse to allow the use of the old TYME logo and brand identity for marketing their next-generation ATM machines.

== See also ==
- ATM usage fees

== Bibliography ==
- Brown, Mary; Ballard, Cindy (2002-02-01). "PULSE Strengthens Position as Leading Industry-Owned EFT Network With Completion of TYME Merger [Press Release Announcing Completed Merger]". Pulse EFT Association. Archived from the original on 2006-03-27.
