= Workers Credit Union =

- Type: Credit union
- Industry: Financial services
- Founded: 1914
- Headquarters: Littleton, Massachusetts, United States
- Number of locations: 16 (2023)
- Area served: Massachusetts
- Key people: Mary Heafy, Chair of the Board; Jay Champion, Interim President and CEO
- Products: Savings; checking; consumer loans; mortgages; credit cards; online banking; business banking
- Total assets: ▲US$ $2.6 billion (2023)
- Members: 124,000+
- Website: www.wcu.com

Workers Credit Union is a state-chartered credit union headquartered in Littleton, Massachusetts. The credit union was established in Fitchburg, Massachusetts in 1914, has more than $2.6 billion in assets, over 124,000 members, and operates sixteen full-service branches located in Athol, Chelmsford, Fitchburg, Gardner, Groton, Hudson, Lancaster, Leominster, Lunenburg, Orange, Townsend, Westford, Worcester, and Lowell. As the organization is a federally insured state-chartered credit union, Workers Credit Union is regulated by the National Credit Union Administration (NCUA). Workers Credit Union was officially chartered in 1914 and was assigned the NCUA charter number 66479.

== History ==
Workers Credit Union was created from the need for banking services for the Finnish population of Fitchburg, first realized in 1911 by John Suominen, the business manager of Raivaaja. That same year he met with the State Banking Commissioner, Pierre Jay, to discuss those needs and to lay the groundwork for establishing a credit union. The Workers Credit Union charter was approved in 1914. In the following years, Workers Credit Union grows by acquiring Gardner Municipal, Nichols and Stone and Orange Credit Union in 1980, Cleghorn Credit Union in 1982, Gardner Polish-American Credit Union in 1984, Atlantic Union College Credit Union and Heritage Credit Union in 1992, Nashoba Credit Union in 1993 and Fitchburg Postal Employees Credit Union in 1998.

== Mergers ==
In 2004, Workers Credit Union merged with 25-year old Westford Municipal Employees Credit Union.

In 2005, Workers Credit Union merged with the $5 million assets Chelmsford Credit Union.

In 2006, Workers Credit Unions merged with Crobank Credit Union, founded in 1936 and owning assets of $1 million, and Peoples Community Credit Union, founded in 1937, with assets of $11 million.

In April 2017, Workers Credit Union acquired and partnered with one of Central Massachusetts’ leading retail insurance agencies, the Braley Wellington Group, a full-service insurance agency with over 200 years of insurance expertise. The Braley Wellington Group provides a complete range of commercial and personal insurance products as well as a full-time claims department and operates out of four locations in Worcester, Auburn, Millbury and Leominster.

== PlanIt ==
In 2020 Workers opened the doors to its three PlanIt locations in Worcester, Lowell, and Hudson, Massachusetts. PlanIt offices feature personal finance coaches and video teller machines.

== Operations ==
In 2015, Workers Credit Union purchased property in Littleton, MA on 119 Russell Street to become the new headquarters office building. Construction of the 60,000 sqft location was completed and opened for use in December 2020. The new headquarters houses WCU’s corporate offices, a number of departments, conference rooms, training rooms, a café, an outdoor dining patio and a fitness center.

In addition to neighborhood branch locations, Workers Credit Union also maintains a high school branch office at Montachusett Regional Vocational Technical School. All branches have 24-hour Automated Teller Machines (ATM). In addition, Workers Credit Union is a member of the SUM (interbank network), Cirrus (interbank network), Money Pass, NYCE and Co-op ATM Networks, giving members’ access to thousands of ATMs without incurring an ATM surcharge.

== Community involvement ==
2020 was a record year in charitable giving, with Workers Credit Union contributing $400,000 in local donations and sponsorships.

In 2019 Workers Credit Union contributed $375,000 in local donations and sponsorships. Employees volunteered over 1,900 hours of their own time to community projects. Workers Credit Union’s Greater Gardner Relay for Life team raised over $42,000.

In 2023, Workers Credit Union announced a new augmented reality game available at Polar Park in Worcester, called Workers Reality. By downloading an app, visitors to the park can interact with holographic imagery, play games and earn WooSox related prizes.

== Recognition ==
In 2020, Workers Credit Union was awarded the Spirit of North Central Massachusetts Award for Corporate Leadership for its exceptional dedication to the community for the United Way of North Central Massachusetts's (UWNCM) 2019-2020 campaign, won the prestigious CUNA Diamond Award for Video (Commercial) Series by the Credit Union National Association (CUNA), recognizing exceptional efforts in credit union marketing and business development, and a CUNA Diamond Award for Best in Category for Financial Education for the credit union's in-branch app.

In 2019, Workers Credit Union received the Worcester County Food Bank’s 2019 Harvester Award, and was recognized as top fundraiser at 2019 Greater Gardner Relay for Life.

In 2018, Workers Credit Union was voted by its members Best in Technology & Tools in Central Massachusetts and Greater Boston, and was voted as Forbes Best Credit Union in Massachusetts.
