= Bank Banten =

Bank of Indonesia

PT Bank Pembangunan Daerah Banten Tbk.
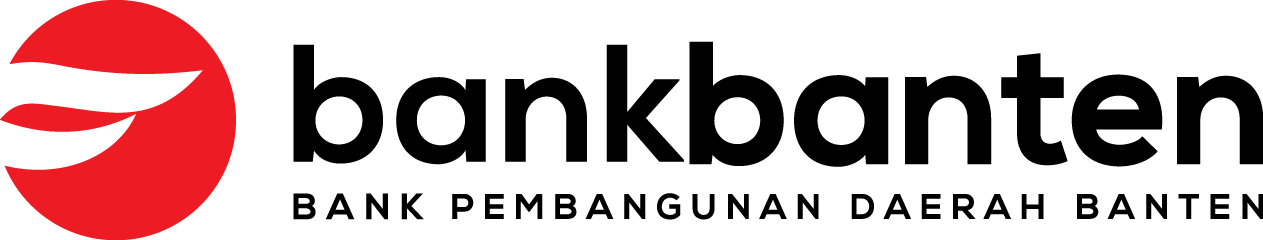
- Company type: Public
- Traded as: IDX: BEKS
- Industry: Financial services, banking
- Predecessors: Executive International Bank; Bank Pundi
- Founded: 11 September 1992; 33 years ago
- Headquarters: Serang, Banten, Indonesia
- Key people: Paulus Wiranata, CEO
- Revenue: ▼ Rp 476.898 ,billion (2016)
- Net income: ▼ Rp - 414,940 billion (2016)
- Total assets: ▼ Rp 5.251 trillion (2016)
- Total equity: ▼Rp 864.578 billion (2016)
- Owner: Government of Banten Province
- Number of employees: 1,833 (2016)
- Website: www.bankbanten.co.id

Bank Pembangunan Daerah Banten (formerly Bank Pundi Indonesia from September 2010 until August 2016, headquartered in Jakarta) is a bank focusing on micro-enterprises and small and medium enterprises. It is a regional development bank owned by the government of Banten province.

== History ==
PT. Bank Pundi Indonesia, Tbk (“Bank Pundi”), was established on 11 September 1992 in Jakarta under the name of PT. Executive International Bank (“Bank Eksekutif”) based on the deed approved by the Minister of Justice with No. C2-9246-HT.01.01 in 1992 and published in the state gazette of the Republic of Indonesia no. 103 dated December 26, 1992, Supplement No. 6651. Operational license was issued on August 9, 1993, as Public Bank in Jakarta referring to the approval of Ministry of Finance, Republic of Indonesia No.673/KMK.017/1993 dated 23 June 1993 regarding the Operational License to PT. Executive International Bank. The name of PT. Executive International Bank was later changed into PT. Bank Eksekutif International, and later on 2001, became a Listed Company further to obtaining approval from the Chairman of the Capital Market Supervisory Agency (Bapepam) in his letter no. S-153/PM/2001 regarding the initial public offering towards its shares as much as 277,500,000 shares with a nominal value of Rp 100 per share to the public. The Bank then was listed in the Jakarta Capital Market on 13 July 2001 under BEKS as its shares’ code.

At the year end of 2012, the Bank had 207 branch offices across Indonesia and 8.200 employees.

Bank Pundi is also accessible from more than 40,000 ATMs across Indonesia through the Prima and ATM Bersama networks.

On 23 April 2020, four years after changing the name to Bank Banten, it was announced that the bank has proposed a merger with Bank BJB. On 7 October 2020, it was announced that the merger was officially abandoned.
