= Money Access Center =

ATM Network in the US

MAC
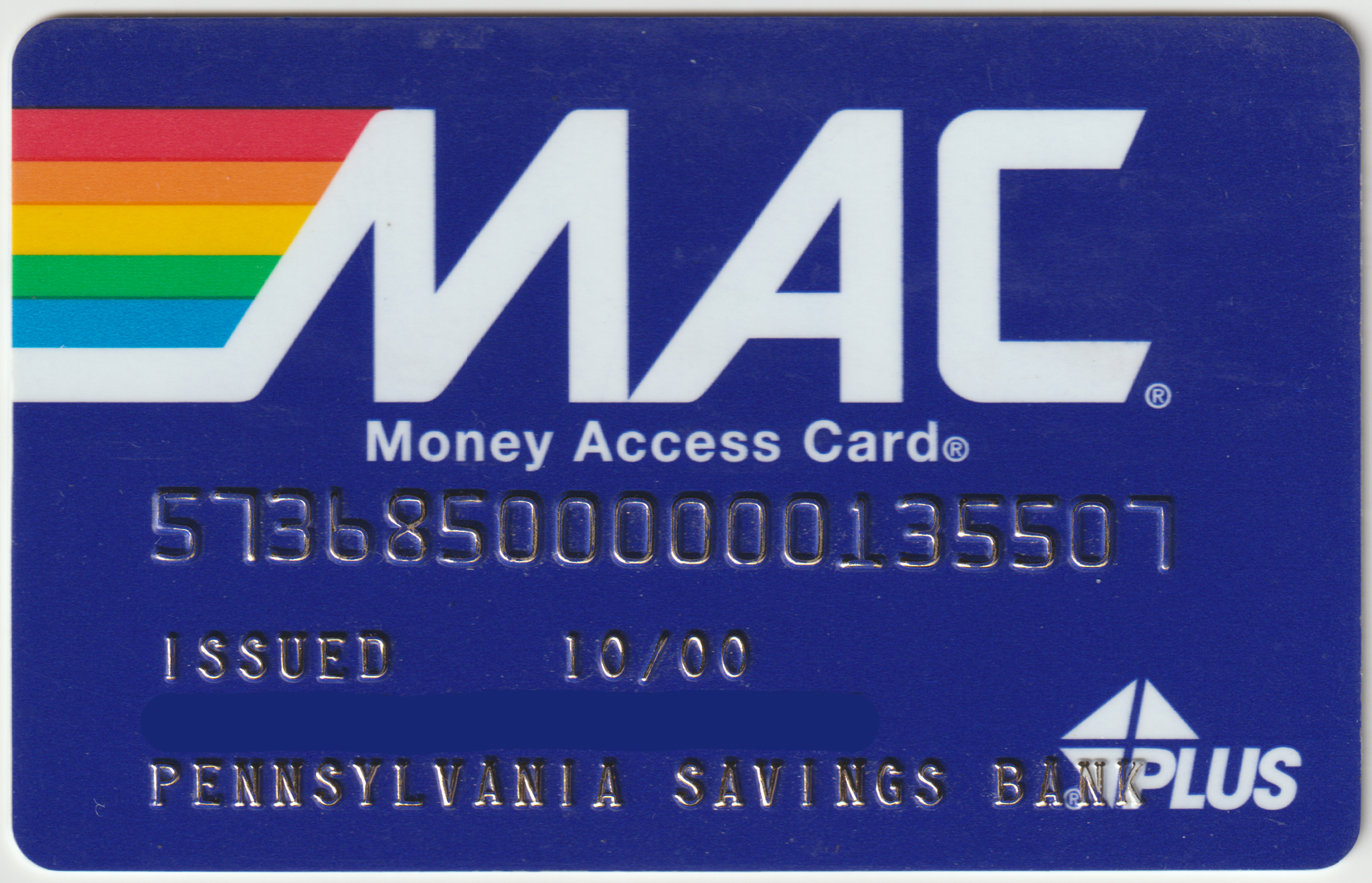
- Operating area: Mid-Atlantic and Midwestern United States
- Founded: 1979
- Defunct: 2005
- Owner: Concord EFS, Inc. (now First Data Corporation)

Money Access Center (MAC, also Money Access Card) was an ATM network in the Mid-Atlantic and Midwestern United States, between 1979 and 2005, when it was absorbed into the STAR network. The network was one of the first in the nation, and helped universalize ATM banking. At its height MAC operated 59,000 ATMs in Pennsylvania, New Jersey, Delaware, Maryland, West Virginia, Kentucky, Ohio, and Michigan.

== History ==
=== Creation ===
MAC was launched in 1979 by the Philadelphia National Bank (PNB), later renamed CoreStates, to compete with the GEORGE network, which was launched one year earlier by Girard Bank. PNB was able to line up support from thirteen other financial institutions at launch, capturing significantly more market share than GEORGE, to the point that the locals preferred the terms "MAC machine" and "MAC card" to "ATM" or "ATM card".

=== Growth and independence ===
In 1988 CoreStates acquired and integrated MAC competitor CashStream, making MAC the second-largest regional ATM network, behind only NYCE. In 1992 CoreStates created a holding company for MAC, called Electronic Payment Services (EPS), headquartered in Wilmington, Delaware. The company was co-owned by CoreStates, Bank One, PNC Bank, and Society Corporation. These were later joined by KeyCorp and National City Corp.

=== Acquisition and merger with STAR ===
Through the 1990s EPS expressed its desire to go public, either by issuing an IPO or by being acquired by a publicly traded company. The latter happened in 1999 when publicly traded Concord EFS acquired EPS for $920 Million. This turned out to be a very profitable deal for Concord, so it acquired two more ATM networks in the next two years, Cash Station and STAR, which expanded Concord's networks to 28 states. In its press-release about the acquisition of STAR in 2001 Concord announced its intent to consolidate the three networks under the STAR banner due to STAR's better name recognition, making STAR the largest ATM network in the country. The MAC (and Cash Station) banner was to be phased out over a period of four years

=== Revival of the name ===
In 2014, JetPay, founded by Bipin Shah, who ran the MAC network while working at CoreStates, announced a product called Money Access Card, a reloadable payment card for JetPay's payroll-processing-company clients. This product was discontinued when JetPay was acquired by NCR Corporation in 2018.

== Legacy ==
MAC Machine and MAC Card continue to be used to refer to ATMs and ATM cards respectively as a regionalism in certain parts of Pennsylvania and New Jersey, along with the phrase tap MAC to describe getting money from an ATM.
