= ATH (interbank network) =

ATH Network
- Operating area: Puerto Rico, U.S. Virgin Islands, nationwide through NYCE, British Virgin Islands, Costa Rica, Dominican Republic
- Members: 19 in Puerto Rico

The ATH Network is an interbank network connecting the ATMs of various financial institutions in Puerto Rico and the Caribbean. ATH also serves as a debit card network for ATH-linked ATM cards. ATH currently has an agreement with the NYCE network to accept NYCE cards in Puerto Rico's ATH network and for Puerto Rico-based ATH cards to be accepted anywhere NYCE is accepted.

ATH is based in San Juan, Puerto Rico and is owned and operated by Evertec Group, LLC. While not official, it stands for 'A Toda Hora', Spanish for 'At All Times'.

== See also ==
- ATM usage fees
