= Interac =

Canadian interbank network

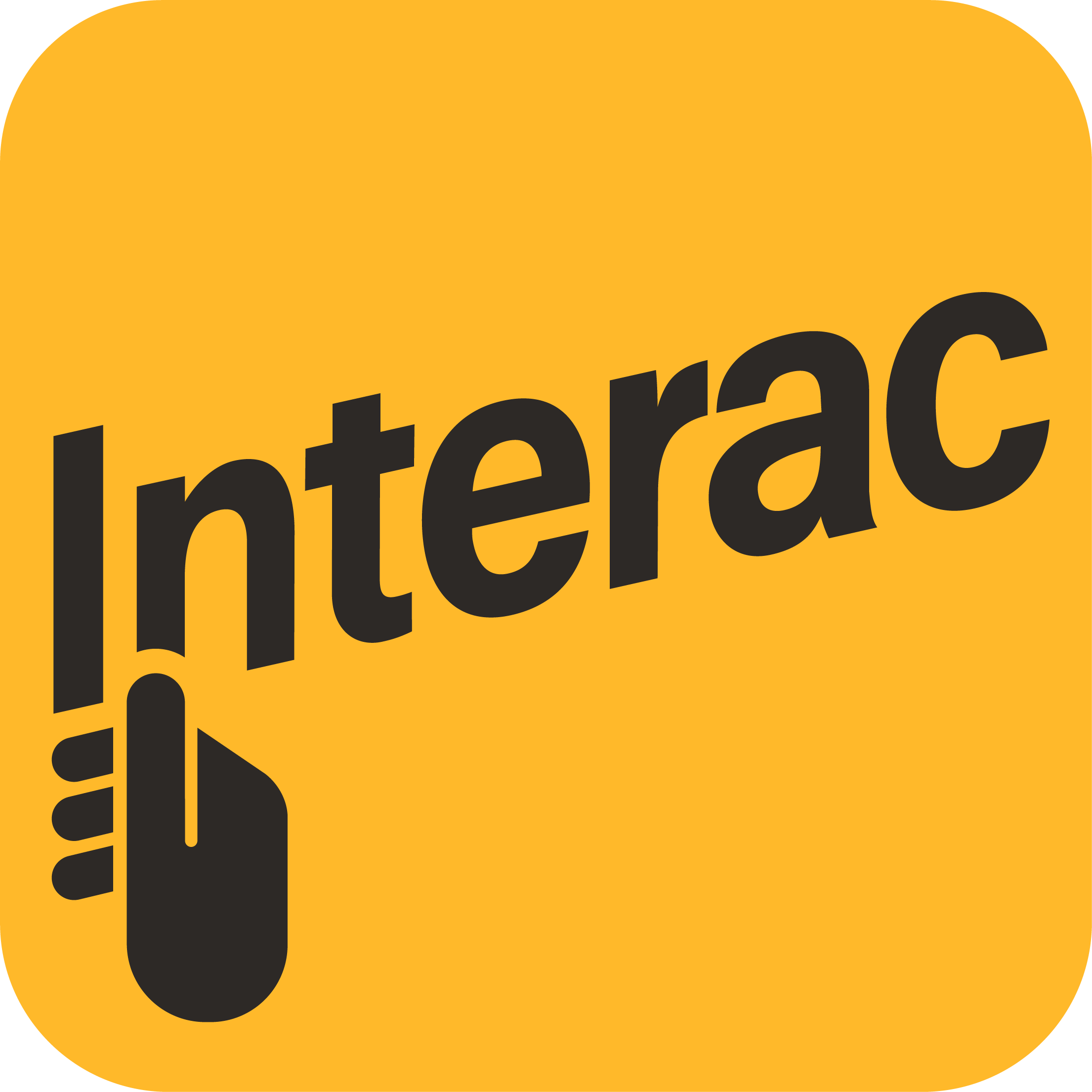
- Operating area: Canada
- Members: 83
- ATMs: 59,000
- Founded: 1984; 42 years ago (as Interac Association); February 1, 2018; 8 years ago (as Interac Corporation)
- Owner: Interac Corporation
- Website: www.interac.ca

Interac is a Canadian interbank network that links financial institutions and other enterprises for the purpose of exchanging electronic financial transactions. Interac serves as the Canadian debit card system and the predominant funds transfer network via its e-Transfer service. There are over 59,000 automated teller machines that can be accessed through the Interac network in Canada, and over 450,000 merchant locations accepting Interac debit payments.

== History ==
Interac Corporation
- Industry: Financial services
- Predecessors: Interac Association; Acxsys Corporation
- Founded: February 1, 2018; 8 years ago

The network was launched in 1984 through the nonprofit Interac Association, a cooperative venture between five financial institutions: RBC, CIBC, Scotiabank, TD, and Desjardins; by 2010, there were over 80 member organizations. The group founded a for-profit counterpart organization, Acxsys, in 1996, which launched additional Interac-branded services including e-transfers. Following several aborted merger attempts which were either blocked by the Competition Bureau or by some of the co-owners between 2008 and 2013, Interac and Acxsys were combined into a single for-profit organization, Interac Corporation, on 1 February 2018. Interac's head office is located at Royal Bank Plaza in Toronto.

In 2019, Interac Corporation acquired 2Keys Corporation, Ottawa-based digital identity and cyber security for governments, financial institutions and commercial clients.

In 2021, Interac Corporation acquired the exclusive rights to the digital ID services for Canada from the digital ID and authentication provider SecureKey Technologies Inc.

On July 8, 2022, all Interac services were disrupted in Canada due to a nationwide Rogers Communications network outage resulting in millions of dollars in lost transactions for businesses. On July 11, 2022, Interac stated they were adding another provider in addition to Rogers to strengthen their network redundancy.

In 2022, Interac introduced its sonic identity,. Developed from research into the influence of music on purchasing behaviour, the sonic identity is deployed across the brand's campaigns and digital experiences.

== Services ==
Interac is the organization responsible for the development of a national network of two shared electronic financial services:

=== Interac Direct Payment (IDP) ===
Interac Direct Payment (IDP) is Canada's national debit card service for purchasing of goods and services. In 1990 Interac launched a new pilot called Interac Direct Payments. Customers enter their personal identification number (PIN) and the amount paid is deducted from either their chequing or savings accounts. As of 2001, the number of transactions completed via IDP has surpassed those completed using physical money. Beginning in 2004, IDP purchases could also be made in the United States at merchants on the NYCE network. IDP is similar in nature to the EFTPOS systems in use in the United Kingdom, Australia and New Zealand.

Interac Direct Payment is a PIN-based system where the information entered on the PIN pad is encrypted and verified at a central server, rather than being stored on the card itself. Because of this, it is significantly more secure than traditional signature or card-based transactions. Despite these security features, there are ongoing fraud concerns, particularly when debit cards are duped or skimmed — a compromised automated teller machine or point-of-sale terminal will record the account information contained in the magnetic strip of the card, allowing for duplicate cards to be created at a later time. The owner of the card is then secretly video taped or observed entering their PIN, allowing a criminal to use duplicate cards to make fraudulent purchases.

==== Interac chip cards ====
In 2007, Interac announced it would be moving to EMV chip card technology. The main benefit to this technology over the existing magnetic stripes is that the chips are almost impossible to copy due to high levels of encryption.

=== Shared Cash Dispensing (SCD) ===
Shared Cash Dispensing (SCD): cash withdrawals from any ABM not belonging to a cardholder's financial institution. This Canada-specific service is similar to international systems like Plus or Cirrus. Virtually every ABM in Canada is on the Interac system.

=== Interac e-Transfer Service ===
The Interac e-Transfer service is offered by CertaPay. It allows online banking customers to send money to anyone with an e-mail address or a cellphone number and a bank account in Canada. Prior to February 2018, this was an Interac-branded service operated by Acxsys Corporation. Interac e-Transfer service is designated as a prominent payment system and is subject to oversight by the Bank of Canada.

=== Interac Online ===
Interac Online was a service that allowed customers to pay for goods and services over the Internet using funds directly from their bank accounts. It was an Online Banking ePayments service very similar to iDEAL in the Netherlands, Giropay in Germany, and Secure Vault Payments in the United States. Because no financial information is shared with the online merchant, the Interac Online service was more secure than online credit card payments. This service, operated by Acxsys Corporation from 2005-2018 and by Interac Corporation since then until its discontinuation, was available to customers of four of the five largest Canadian banks: RBC, BMO, Scotiabank, and TD Canada Trust by 2007.

By February 2009, Interac Online was supported by roughly 300 merchants including two large universities (for tuition payments), two major wireless carriers, provincial lottery corporations, and a wide variety of retailers. It was later adopted by Paymentwall (for payments to third-party merchants) and the Canada Revenue Agency (for income tax payments).

The service was discontinued on October 31, 2024. Prior to its discontinuation, the service steadily lost support from both merchants and financial institutions, likely due to the increasing prevalence of co-badged Debit Mastercard and Visa Debit cards.

== See also ==
- ATM usage fees
- White-label ABMs

== Bibliography ==
- Interac Association (2006). At the Merchant 2006. How it works. Retrieved 19 June 2006, from
- Interac Association (2006). At the Merchant 2006. Benefits. Retrieved 19 June 2006, from
- Interac Association (2006). At the Merchant 2006. Fees. Retrieved 19 June 2006, from
