= Plus (interbank network) =

Worldwide interbank network

Visa Plus
- Operating area: Worldwide (except Russia)
- Members: Over 100,000,000
- ATMs: 1.8 million in over 200 countries and territories around the world
- Founded: April 1, 1982; 44 years ago
- Owner: Visa Inc.

Visa Plus is a worldwide interbank network that provides cash to Visa cardholders. As a subsidiary of Visa Inc., it connects all Visa credit, debit and prepaid cards, as well as ATM cards issued by various banks worldwide bearing the Visa / Electron logo.

Plus System, Inc. started out as a consortium formed by 34 major U.S. banks to build a national network of automated teller machines (ATM). It initially was composed of 2,000 ATMs linking 1,000 banks and their customers in 47 states. As the booming ATM industry outgrew regional networks and began to go nationwide in the mid-1980s, payment card giant Visa sought entry in the lucrative ATM network business and acquired a third of Plus System in 1987. Currently, there are over one million Plus-linked ATMs in 170 countries worldwide.

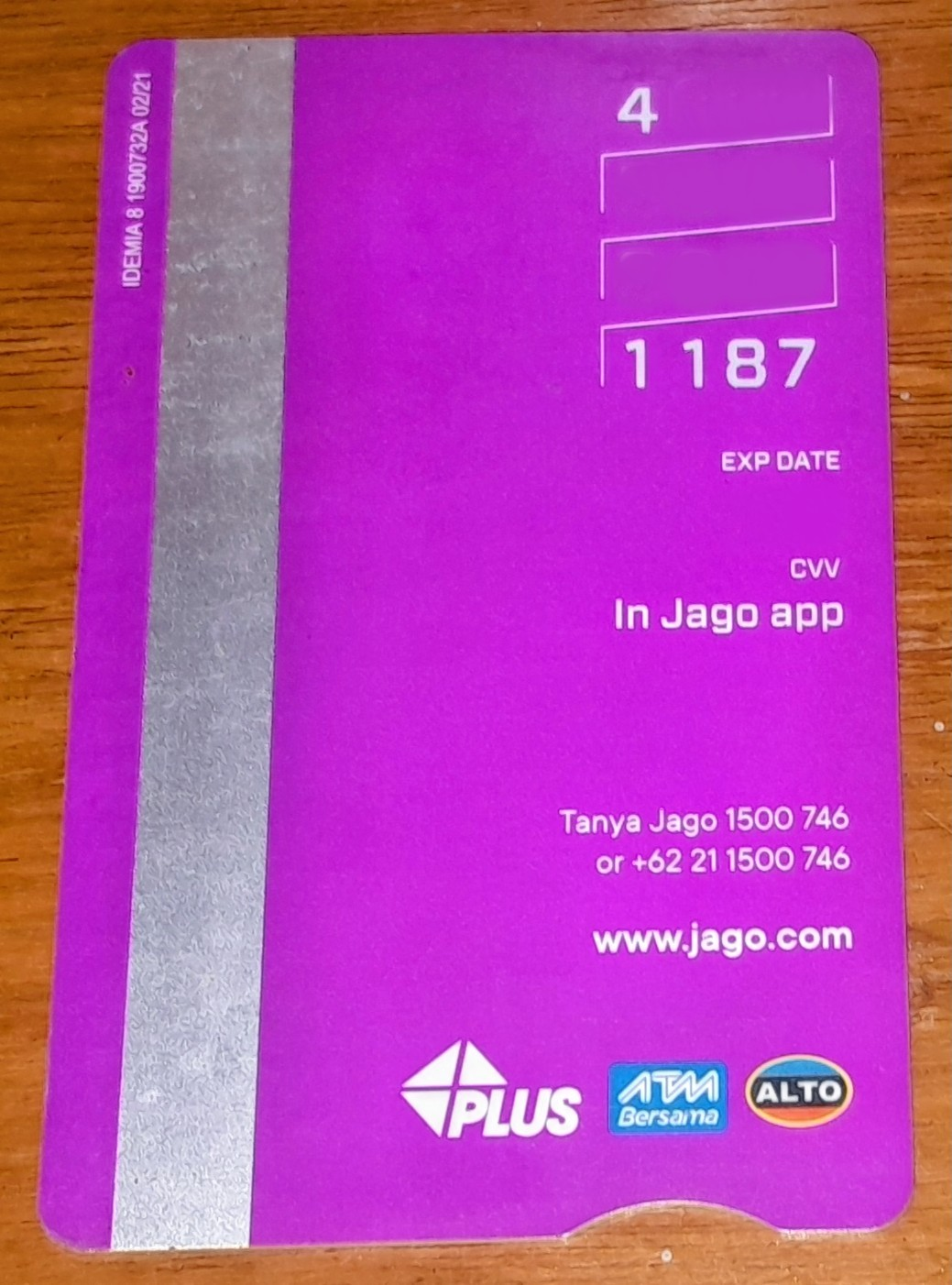
Example of a Visa Debit card with Plus logo on the back side

By default, Visa / Electron cards are linked to the Plus network, with Plus logo on the back of the cards. Plus is widely used as a local interbank network most common in the United States where networks such as STAR, NYCE and Pulse also compete. It is also used in Canada where it is usually combined with Interac, and in India and Indonesia where there are numerous competing interbank networks. The main competitor of Plus System is the Cirrus network, which is owned by Mastercard, Visa's longtime rival.
