= Connecticut Community Bank =

US community bank and mortgage provider

- Company type: Corporation
- Industry: Banking, Mortgages
- Founded: 1998
- Headquarters: Norwalk, Connecticut
- Number of locations: 9
- Area served: Connecticut
- Subsidiaries: Darien Bank and Trust, Greenwich Bank and Trust, Norwalk Bank and Trust, Stamford Bank and Trust, Westport National Bank, Insurbanc
- Website: ccbankonline.com

Branch locations map (as of October 2018)

Connecticut Community Bank is a full-service community bank and mortgage provider serving customers in Connecticut. The bank is headquartered in Norwalk, Connecticut, and was founded in 1998. The bank was founded as a result of a merger between several historic banks in Connecticut, including Darien Bank and Trust, Greenwich Bank and Trust, Norwalk Bank and Trust, Stamford Bank and Trust, Westport National Bank and InsurBanc.

Connecticut Community Bank is a member of the SUM ATM network.
