= SUM (interbank network) =

- Operating area: United States
- Website: www.sum-atm.com

SUM is an interbank network in forty-two U.S. states (all except Alaska, Alabama, Delaware, Montana, Nebraska, North Dakota, South Dakota, Wyoming), the District of Columbia and Puerto Rico. It is largely made up of smaller local banks and credit unions. Account holders at member institutions do not pay ATM usage fees for using ATMs of any other financial institution within the network.

SUM is a product of NYCE Payments Network, LLC, an FIS company.

== See also ==
- ATM usage fees
