= CoreStates Financial Corporation =

American bank holding company

- Industry: Bank holding company
- Founded: 1803; 223 years ago (as The Philadelphia Bank)
- Defunct: 1998
- Fate: Acquired by First Union Corporation
- Successor: Wells Fargo (formerly Wachovia/First Union)
- Headquarters: Philadelphia
- Products: Financial services

CoreStates Financial Corporation, previously known as Philadelphia National Bank (PNB), was an American bank holding company in the Philadelphia metropolitan area.

The bank was renamed in the mid-1980s after a series of mergers. After being acquired by First Union Corporation, which later also acquired Wachovia National Bank to become Wachovia Corporation, CoreStates Financial Corporation became a part of Wells Fargo in 2008 when Wachovia (formerly known as First Union) was acquired by that company.

== History ==
=== Philadelphia National Bank and First Pennsylvania Bank ===
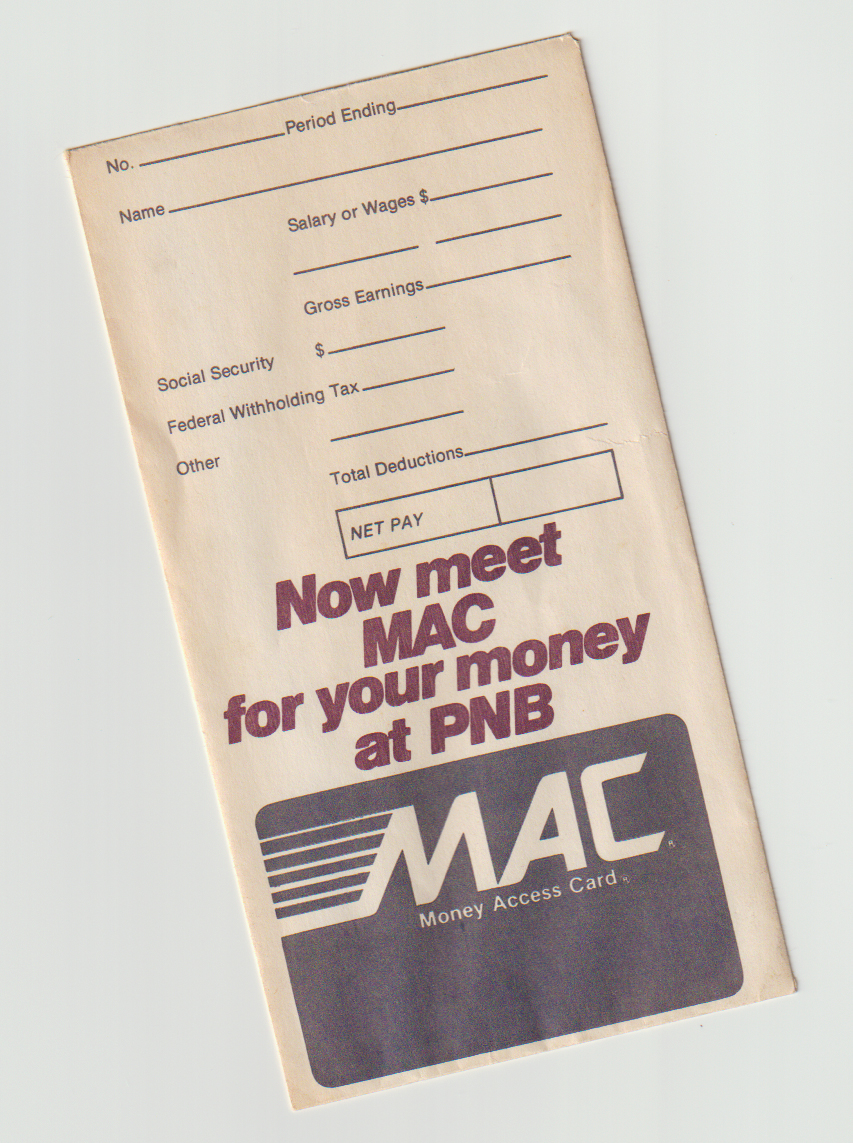
Payroll Envelope Advertising PNB MAC ATM Card

The bank was founded in Philadelphia on September 8, 1803, as The Philadelphia Bank. George Clymer was the bank's first president. Later, the bank became known as Philadelphia National Bank, or PNB.

During the early years of the United States, Philadelphia developed as the banking center of the country. The First Bank of the United States chartered in 1791, was based in the city until its charter expired in 1811, at which point its building was purchased by the preeminent American banker Stephen Girard to house his banking operation, known as The Bank of Stephen Girard. (That is not to be confused with Girard Bank, which was created by several prominent Philadelphia businessmen after Girard's death and named in his honor.)

In 1816, Congress chartered the Second Bank of the United States, which was directed for most of the period 1816 to 1836 by Nicholas Biddle, the nation's first chief banker and scion of the city's most iconic family.

The Philadelphia National Bank was neither the oldest nor the most aggressive of the big banks headquartered in the nation's birthplace for most of the city's history. That distinction went to the First Pennsylvania Bank, the "Pennsylvania Company for Insurance on Lives and Granting Annuities." While founded as an insurance company in 1809 (chartered 1812), it traces back to an even earlier banking dynasty. The Bank of North America was chartered in 1781 by the Continental Congress as America's first bank. It went through a number of charter changes and minor upheavals until merging with the Commercial Trust Company to form 1923's Bank of North America and Trust Company. That didn't survive long; by the 1870s, Pennsylvania Company for Insurance on Lives and Granting Annuities had transitioned to banking in the 1870s, and it bought the old bank in 1929, and shortly thereafter renamed itself the Pennsylvania Company for Banking and Trust whose vault was designed by Frederick S. Holmes. It was led in the twentieth century by an increasingly ambitious and risk-taking board of directors. Another merger with First National Bank in 1955 brought another name change, prepending "First," and the First National branch at 315 Chestnut Street was maintained until the Wells Fargo period. Serendipitously, 315 Chestnut is next door to the original location of the Bank of North America at 305 Chestnut.

PNB, on the other hand, maintained a reputation for financial caution and civic responsibility. On occasion, the bank made headlines for quiet innovations, such as when during the late 1960s it led all the nation's banks in ending the practice of "redlining" poorer neighborhoods so that personal and small business loans could be extended to residents of poorer city districts, or when, during the middle 1970s, the bank helped universalize ATM banking by building one of the nation's first and largest network of banking machines, known by their acronym, "MAC", for Money Access Center or Money Access Card.

By the dawn of the new age of banking in the late 1970s and 1980s, when lending grew highly competitive and banks began vying for power and influence by buying each other, PNB was well positioned to compete. It maintained offices in all of the major financial capitals of the world with headquarters of its subsidiary, Philadelphia International Bank (PIB), in London and New York City, through its practice of correspondent banking. PNB was particularly aggressive in the then-developing Middle East oil-rich states. The real estate bust of the late 1970s, accompanied by high interest rates and rates of foreclosure, did not hurt PNB to the extent it did its more highly exposed crosstown rival, First Pennsylvania, which never completely recovered from the temporary collapse of the real estate investment trust (REIT) industry and was eventually purchased by PNB in 1990.

=== Creation of CoreStates ===
PNB's first merger involved Hamilton Bank of central Pennsylvania in 1982; later, in the mid-1980s, it took control of New Jersey National Bank of Trenton, New Jersey. Corestates Financial Corporation evolved out of the merger of PNB with Hamilton. Meanwhile, Corestates Bank of Delaware focused on lending to many corporations including chemical giant DuPont, headquartered in the low-tax First State just south of the Pennsylvania border. After it acquired First Pennsylvania Bank in 1990, CoreStates/PNB spent $20 million to win naming rights for 20 years for the new arena being built next to Philadelphia's Spectrum which subsequently became known as the "CoreStates Center" associated with the bank holding company.

In the fall of 1995, CoreStates acquired another regional rival, Meridian Bancorp, at $3.2 billion their largest acquisition to date. George W. Strawbridge Jr., a Campbell's director, heir to the Strawbridge & Clothier department store fortune, and major shareholder in Meridian Bancorp, became director and largest individual shareholder in the Corestates Corporation, continuing an ongoing marriage between the bank and one of the region's most iconic companies, the Campbell Soup Company, which in the 1970s made G. Morris Dorrance Jr., scion of the Campbell clan and prominent Gladwyne, Pennsylvania, socialite, PNB's board chairman.

=== Acquisition by First Union ===
In the rash of regional bank takeovers that occurred near the end of the twentieth century, CoreStates was then acquired by First Union Corporation of Charlotte, North Carolina, in 1998. The CoreStates-First Union merger, at $17 billion, was then the largest bank merger that had ever taken place in the United States. First Union later bought Wachovia National Bank in 2001 and the combined company took the Wachovia brand name.

Wachovia Bank, suffering losses during the 2008 financial crisis, was acquired by Wells Fargo, headquartered in San Francisco.

== Headquarters building ==
The company's original headquarters building is located at the corner of Broad and Chestnut Streets in Center City, a district in Philadelphia, and is known as One South Broad. It has long been known for the oversized bell on its uppermost floor which once tolled at noon over the city's financial district, once centered at the foot of its building but now moved farther west among the office buildings lining West Market Street. First Pennsylvania Bank's Centre Square twin office towers, with their iconic Clothespin sculpture by Claes Oldenburg, shifted the center of the district west at its opening in 1976.

In 1973, the bank opened a second Center City office complex on Independence Mall at Fifth and Market Streets which became the headquarters for its operations divisions. In keeping with the company's civic commitment to the City of Philadelphia, the bank simultaneously redesigned and rebuilt SEPTA's 5th Street/Independence Hall subway station on the Market-Frankford/Blue Line at the intersection's northeast corner, a station whose design then won international awards for its striking combination of colors, textures, and materials.
