= MoneyPass =

American interbank network

- Operating area: United States
- Members: 1,700
- ATMs: 61,000 (February 2020)
- Founded: October 2003; 22 years ago
- Owner: Fiserv
- Website: www.moneypass.com

MoneyPass is an American interbank network owned by Brookfield, Wisconsin-based Fiserv, the third largest North American financial services company by revenue.

Previously, MoneyPass had been owned by Elan Financial Services, a business unit of U.S. Bank. MoneyPass provides surcharge-free ATM services to North American MoneyPass consumer/cardholders whose transactions utilize a MoneyPass supported ATM and has become the second largest surcharge free ATM network in the United States.

There are 61,000 surcharge-free MoneyPass ATMs in the United States, located at financial institutions and retail locations.

More than 95 million consumers have access to MoneyPass ATMs.

== History ==
Genpass, Inc., formed the MoneyPass ATM network in October 2003 by merging two existing regional ATM networks that it had already owned, MoneyMaker in Texas and MoneyBelt in Tennessee. Union Planters, with nearly 900 ATMs located in 12 states, was a charter member. In December 2003, the regional supermarket chain Minyard Food Stores installed MoneyPass ATMs at its 72 stores. By June 2004, MoneyPass had 200 participants and 8,000 ATMs. Zions Bank joined in September 2004, adding 200 ATMs in Utah and Idaho. Credit Union 24, which represents 410 credit unions with a total of 2,800 ATMs in 23 states, made a reciprocal agreement in November 2004 which would allow members of each networks to access ATMs on the other network surcharge free.

MoneyPass had 8,000 ATMs in all 50 states by the time Citibank joined its network in October 2004 which added 2,600 Citibank ATMs to the network.

U.S. Bancorp acquired Genpass along with MoneyPass for an undisclosed amount in May 2005 and added its ATMs to the network to form a 12,000 ATM network in June 2006.

In June 2005, KeyCorp signed an agreement with MoneyPass to allow Credit Unions and its other financial institutional clients that it services the option to connect to the MoneyPass network. This agreement only affected financial institutional clients and not KeyBank customers. As a part of the agreement, KeyBank customers were not given access to MoneyPass and MoneyPass customers were not allowed free access to KeyBank's large ATM network. In July 2012, Kroger signed an agreement with U.S. Bancorp to have its Kroger Prepaid Debit Card customers be allowed surcharge free access at all MoneyPass ATMs.

In August 2017, 7-Eleven signed an agreement with MoneyPass to have ATMs at 8,000 of its 10,900 American stores be a part of the surcharge free network.

In September 2018, Fiserv announced that it would acquire MoneyPass from US Bancorp for $690 million. The deal was finalized in March 2019. At the time of the sale, MoneyPass had 33,000 ATMs.

== See also ==
- ATM usage fees
- Debit Card
