= Pulse (interbank network) =

Interbank electronic funds transfer network in the United States

- Industry: Financial services electronic funds transfer
- Predecessor: Gulfnet; MoneyStation
- Founded: 1981; 45 years ago
- Headquarters: United States
- Number of locations: 4,400+ U.S. financial institutions
- Products: Pulse Pay
- Parent: Capital One
- Website: www.pulsenetwork.com

Pulse is an interbank electronic funds transfer (EFT) network in the United States. It serves more than 4,400 U.S. financial institutions and includes more than 380,000 ATMs, as well as POS terminals nationwide. Rivals of the network include First Data's STAR and Fidelity National Information Services's NYCE. It is owned by Capital One, issuer of the Discover Card since 2025, and is included in Discover's agreement with China UnionPay; cards can be used on each other's network leading to better acceptance outside large cities than the larger networks.

== History ==
Historical PULSE logo used prior to Discover rebranding

The Pulse system was based on software that operated the Take Your Money Everywhere (TYME) network operating in the central United States. The network was established as the banking rules that limited banks' and branches' ability to share services were removed. The data processing facilities were originally provided by First City Bank and later transitioned to Texas Commerce Bank.

In 1981, Pulse incorporated and began operating its regional EFT switching facility. In 1995, it launched Pulse Pay, a point-of-sale service where cardholders can use their ATM card at retailers.

Pulse announced the acquisition of Gulfnet, a Louisiana-based regional EFT network in 1997 and announced the acquisition of the Cincinnati-based MoneyStation network in 2000.

Pulse merged with Wisconsin-based Tyme Corporation in 2002, and was acquired by Discover Financial Services in 2005. Capital One then acquired Discover Financial in 2025.

== See also ==
- Interbank network
- ATM usage fees
