= Allpoint =

ATM network

- Operating area: United States, Canada, Mexico, United Kingdom, Australia, and New Zealand
- Members: ±1,100
- ATMs: Over 230,000
- Founded: 2003; 23 years ago
- Owner: NCR Atleos
- Website: www.allpointnetwork.com

Allpoint is an interbank network connecting automated teller machines (ATMs). It offers surcharge-free transactions at ATMs in its network. It operates in the United States, Canada, Mexico, United Kingdom, Australia, and New Zealand. Allpoint is owned by NCR Atleos.

== History ==
Allpoint was founded in 2003 by entrepreneur Ben Psillas of ATM National, Inc., who was tired of looking for ATMs from his own bank.

In 2005, Cardtronics acquired ATM National, Inc. and Allpoint.

In September 2008, Allpoint added ATMs at 5,500 7-Eleven stores to its network.

In October 2010, the network expanded to Australia.

In January 2011, the network expanded to Mexico. In July 2016, Fifth Third Bank joined the network.

In 2015, network member KeyBank of Ohio was awarded a contract to distribute unemployment claims in the state of New York. Large numbers of New Yorkers were able to leverage the network affiliation to avoid surcharges against their COVID-19 related unemployment benefits when their preferred ATM machines were emptied during the 2020 pandemic.

In September 2016, First Tennessee joined the network.

In July 2017, Rite Aid joined the network. Kroger stores in Atlanta were also added to the network. Effective July 2017, ATMs in 7-Eleven stores were removed from the network.

In September 2017, Speedway LLC joined the network.

In October 2017, Five Star Bank joined the network.

Also in 2017, the network counted over 200,000 affiliated ATM machines and became the largest ATM owner/operator in the world.
