= ATM card =

Type of bank card providing access to Automatic Teller Machines

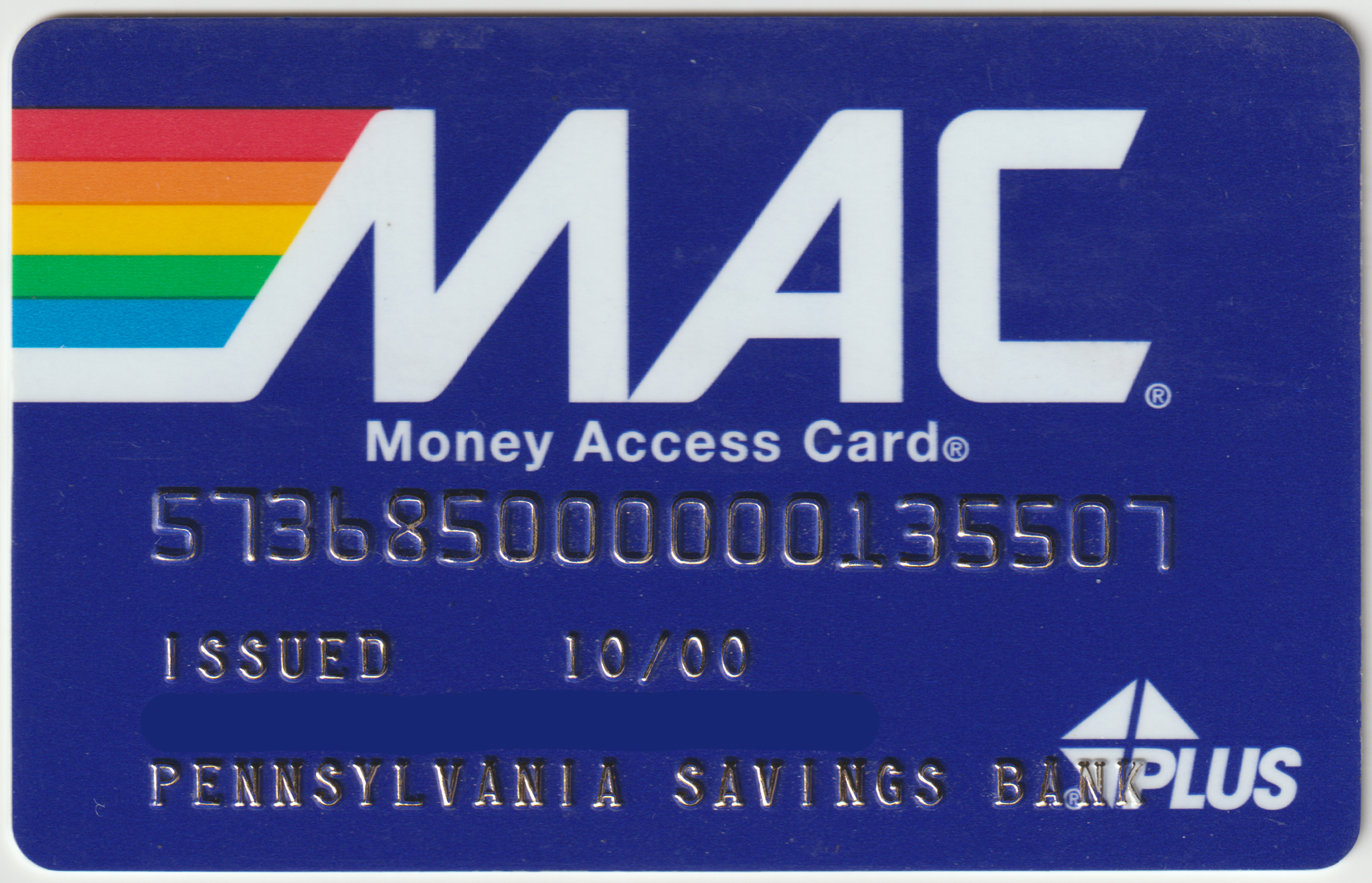
MAC (Money Access Card) ATM Card

A card belongs to an account which belongs to a customer

An ATM card is a dedicated payment card issued by a financial institution (i.e. a bank) which enables a customer to access their financial accounts via its and others' automated teller machines (ATMs) and, in some countries, to make approved point of purchase retail transactions. Many ATM cards also doubled as cheque guarantee cards. ATM cards are not credit or debit cards, however most credit and debit cards can also act as ATM cards and that is the most common way that banks issue cards since the 2010s.

ATM cards are payment card size and style plastic cards with a magnetic stripe and/or a plastic smart card with a chip that contains a unique card number and some security information such as an expiration date or CVV. ATM cards are known by a variety of names such as bank card, MAC (money access card), client card, key card or cash card, among others. Other payment cards, such as debit cards and credit cards can also function as ATM cards. Charge and proprietary cards cannot be used as ATM cards. The use of a credit card to withdraw cash at an ATM is treated differently from a point of sale transaction, usually attracting interest charges from the date of the cash withdrawal.

Interbank networks allow the use of ATM cards at ATMs of private operators and financial institutions other than those of the institution that issued the cards. The difference between an ATM card and a debit card is the underlying network used to process the transaction. Some debit card networks started their lives as ATM card networks before evolving into full-fledged debit card networks that include eftpos facilities.

== History ==
The first ATM cards were issued in 1967 by Barclays in London.

== Dimensions ==
The size of ATM cards is 85.60 mm × 53.98 mm (3.370 in × 2.125 in) and rounded corners with a radius of 2.88–3.48 mm, in accordance with ISO/IEC 7810#ID-1, the same size as other payment cards, such as credit, debit and other cards. They also have a printed or embossed bank card number conforming with the ISO/IEC 7812 numbering standard.

== ATM uses ==
All ATMs, at a minimum, will permit cash withdrawals of customers of the machine's owner (if a bank-operated machine) and for cards that are affiliated with any ATM network the machine is also affiliated. They will report the amount of the withdrawal and any fees charged by the machine on the receipt. Most banks and credit unions will permit routine account-related banking transactions at the bank's own ATM, including deposits, checking the balance of an account, and transferring money between accounts.

Some ATM cards can also be used at a branch, as identification for in-person transactions.

The use of the ATM card for in store purchases or refunds is allowed only with pre-approved retailers, but not for on-line transactions.

For other types of transactions through telephone or online banking, this may be performed with an ATM card without in-person authentication. This includes account balance inquiries, electronic bill payments, or in some limited cases, online purchases (see Interac Online).

== Card networks ==
ATM cards operate through specific networks. Interlink is just one example of the many ATM networks.

Canada's Interac and Mastercard's Maestro are examples of networks that link bank accounts with point-of-sale equipment.

Some debit card networks also started their lives as ATM card networks before evolving into full-fledged debit card networks such as STAR (Interbank Network), and others such as: Development Bank of Singapore (DBS)'s Network for Electronic Transfers (NETS) and Bank Central Asia (BCA)'s Debit BCA, both of them were later on adopted by other banks (with Prima Debit being the Prima interbank network version of Debit BCA).

== Misuse ==
Due to increased illegal copies of cards with a magnetic stripe, the European Payments Council established a Card Fraud Prevention Task Force in 2003 that spawned a commitment to migrate all ATMs and POS applications to use a chip-and-PIN solution by the end of 2010. The "SEPA for Cards" has completely removed the magnetic stripe requirement from Maestro debit cards.

== In Vietnam ==
In Vietnam, ATM cards are commonly understood as debit cards, also known as domestic debit cards. According to the State Bank of Vietnam, as of November 2023, there are over 190 million ATM cards in Vietnam, an increase of 14.6% compared to the same period in 2022. In November 2023, the total value of transactions via ATM reached over 1,300 trillion VND, an increase of 16.3% compared to the same period in 2022.

== See also ==
- Card (disambiguation)
- Charge card
- Credit card
- Debit card
- Payment card
- Plastic card
- Purchasing card
- Stored-value card
