= Indonesian regional development bank =

Type of bank in Indonesia

Regional Development Banks (Indonesian: Bank Pembangunan Daerah, or BPD) are a type of bank in Indonesia that is established and owned by the local provincial government. Its purpose is to boost regional development and provide initial capital to the province that private banks would not risk giving, as well as giving basic financial services for the general provincial population. It was first established on 25 March 1960 and regulated under Law Number 13 of 1962 and Law Number 16 of 1999 Decree from the Ministry of Home Affairs. According to the law, the shares of Regional Development Banks are divided into two; priority shares and regular shares. Priority shares ownership must be on the hand of provincial governments, while regular shares can be owned by second-level administrative governments under the respective provinces (regencies & cities) and individuals. The director of these banks are appointed directly by the governor of the respective provinces and hold the office for 4 years. Provincial governors also have the ability to remove directors from the office for several reasons such as incompetency and corruption, with recommendation from local provincial parliaments. If there is more than one director, the law also states that they are not allowed to be closely related and should not occupy other governmental positions unless recommended. As of 2021, there are 26 regional development banks according to the Financial Services Authority. Not all provinces currently have their own bank, especially newly established provinces such as North Kalimantan and the Bangka Belitung Islands, which both still share ownership of various bank companies with their respective parent provinces.

In addition, some regional banks have subsidiaries in forms of BPRs (Bank Perkreditan Rakyat, or People's Credit Banks) which are usually owned and operated by governments of regencies or cities, acting as municipally owned corporations. These BPRs, according to the Financial Services Authority, exist to serve local people on providing basic financial services & credits, and are not allowed to demand deposits, do foreign exchange activities, and have insurance services, hence differing from either BPDs or conventional banks. As of December 2020, combined there are more than 1,500 of BPR companies in Indonesia.

== List of banks ==
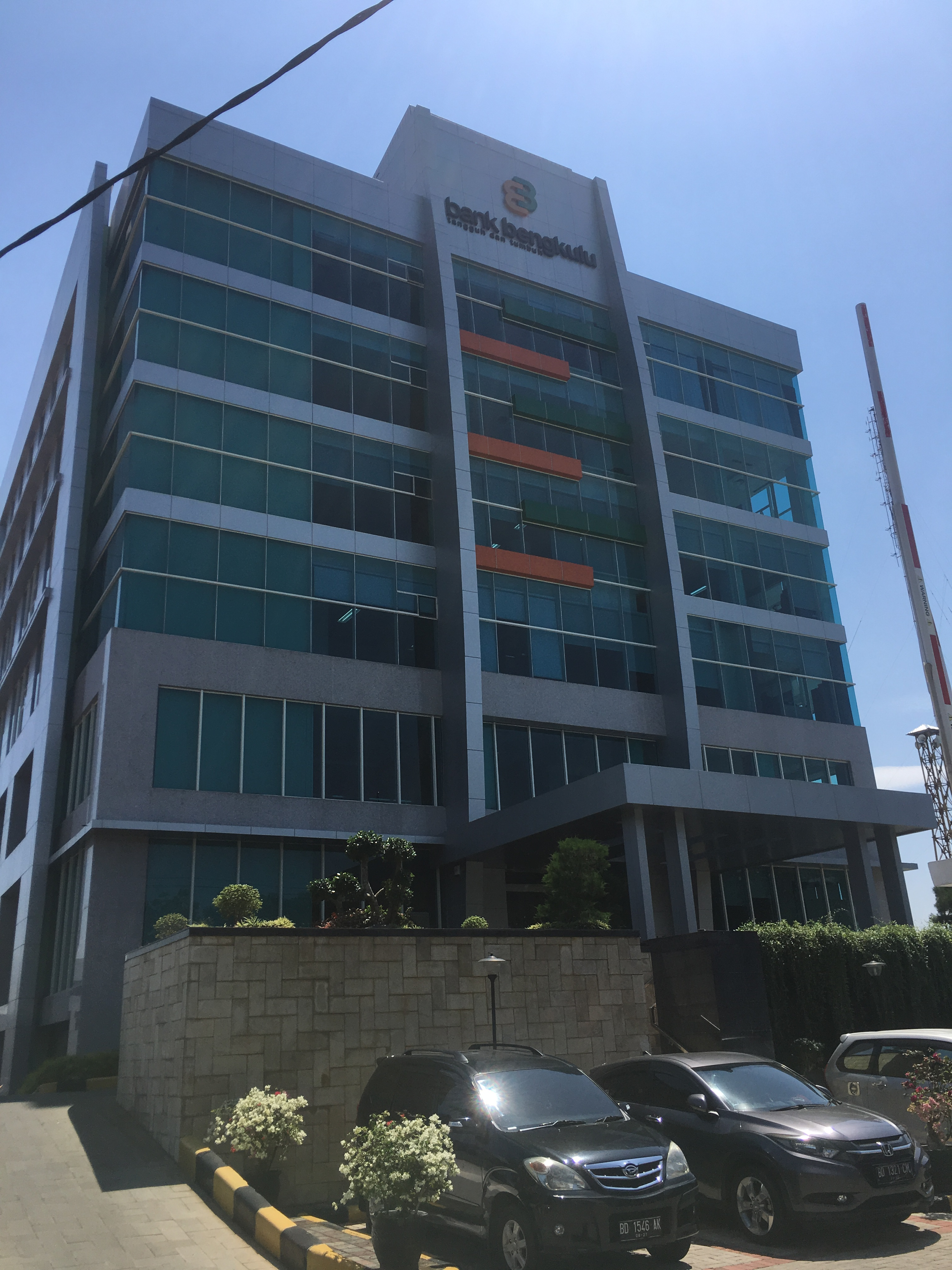
Bank Bengkulu building in Bengkulu

- Bank Aceh (Aceh)
- Bank BPD Bali (Bali)
- Bank Bengkulu (Bengkulu)
- Bank Jakarta (Jakarta)
- Bank Jambi (Jambi)
- Bank Banten (Banten)
- Bank Jateng (Central Java)
- Bank BJB (West Java)
- Bank Jatim (East Java)
- Bankaltimtara (East Kalimantan and North Kalimantan)
- Bank Kalteng (Central Kalimantan)
- Bank Kalbar (West Kalimantan)
- Bank Kalsel (South Kalimantan)
- Bank Lampung (Lampung)
- Bank Maluku Malut (Maluku and North Maluku)
- Bank NTB Syariah (West Nusa Tenggara)
- Bank NTT (East Nusa Tenggara)
- Bank Papua (Papua, Central Papua, Highland Papua, South Papua, Southwest Papua, West Papua)
- BRK Syariah (Riau Islands and Riau)
- Bank Sultra (Southeast Sulawesi)
- Bank Sulteng (Central Sulawesi)
- BSG (North Sulawesi and Gorontalo)
- Bank Sulselbar (South Sulawesi and West Sulawesi)
- Bank Nagari (West Sumatra)
- Bank Sumsel Babel (South Sumatra and Bangka Belitung Islands)
- Bank Sumut (North Sumatra)
- Bank BPD DIY (Special Region of Yogyakarta)
