= Banco24Horas =

- Operating area: Brazil
- Members: 34
- ATMs: 24,000
- Founded: 1982; 44 years ago
- Owner: Tecnologia Bancária S.A.
- Website: www.banco24horas.com.br

Banco24Horas is a Brazilian interbank network and financial solutions company. Operated by Tecban (Tecnologia Bancária S.A.), Banco24Horas works with over 150 partner institutions and offers more than 24,000 ATMs across 900 Brazilian cities.

Customers with personal checking accounts are entitled to fee-free withdrawals at Banco24Horas ATMs. Banco24Horas currently serves 152 million Brazilians, which corresponds to 70% of Brazil's gross domestic product.

== Members ==
- American Express
- Banco do Brasil
- Banco BMG
- Banco do Nordeste
- Banco Pan
- Banco Votorantim
- Banestes
- Banpará
- Banrisul
- Banco de Brasília
- Caixa Econômica Federal
- Carrefour Soluções Financeiras
- Cetelem - Aura
- Citibank
- Diners Club
- Banco Itaú
- Banco Safra
- Banco Santander
