= ALTO (interbank network) =

Indonesian interbank network

ALTO PT ALTO Network
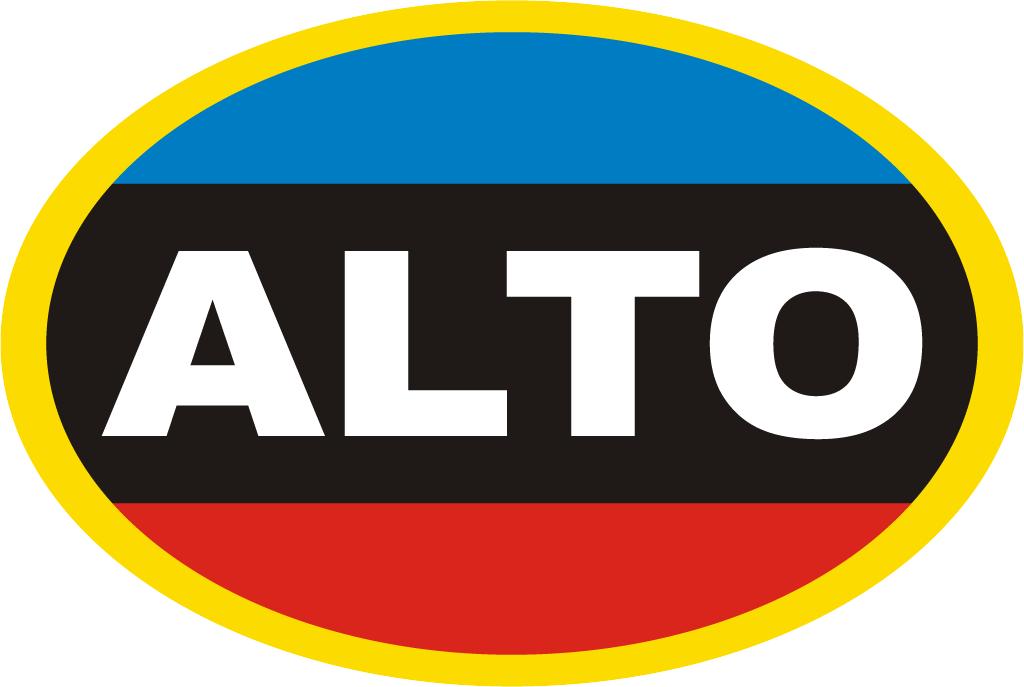
- Operating area: Indonesia
- Members: 23
- ATMs: 8000+
- Founded: August 1993
- Owner: Djarum

ALTO is an interbank network in Indonesia. It was founded in August 1993.

== History ==
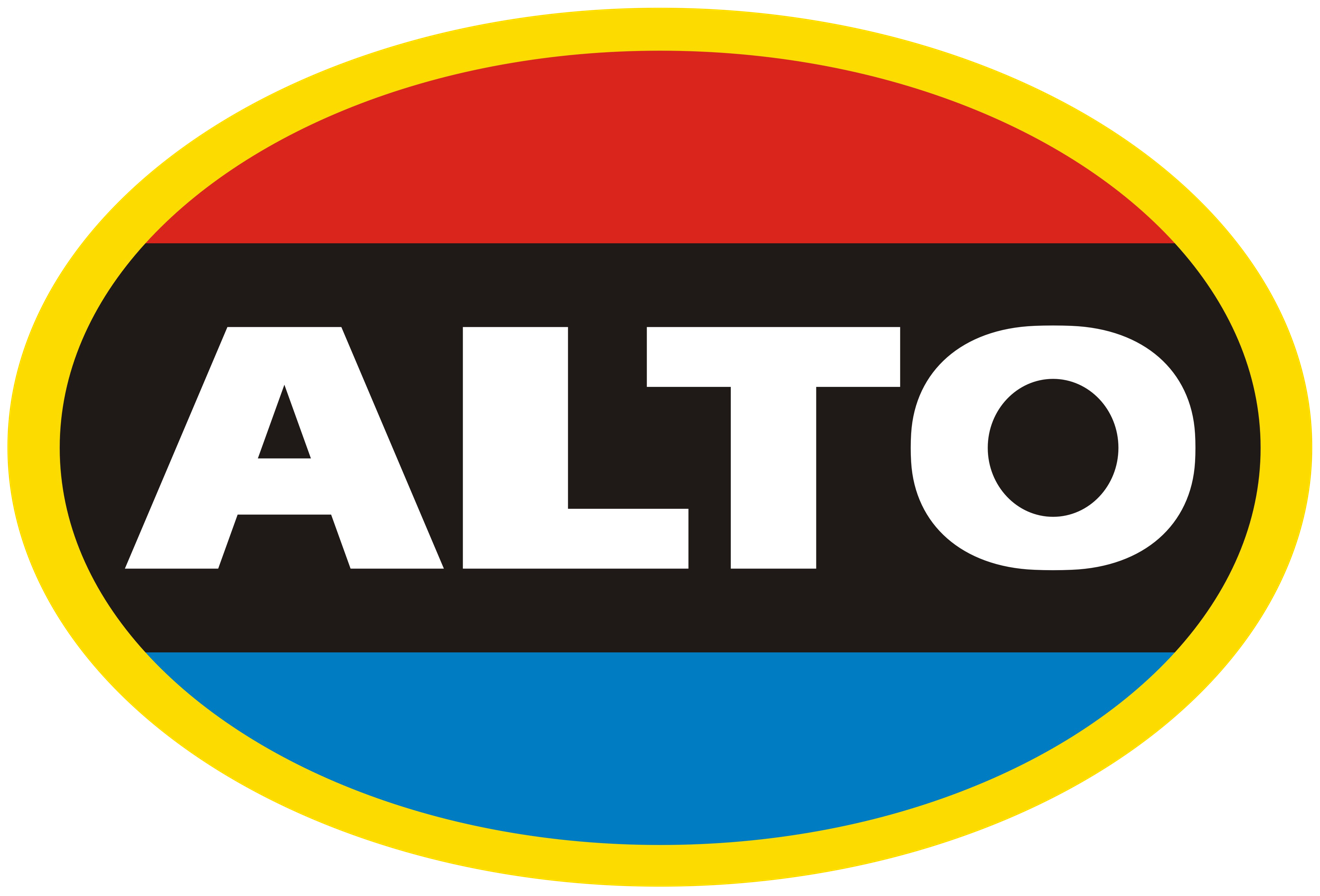
Previous ALTO logo used until 3 October 2015

In 2007, ALTO expanded its business to money transfer operations. In 2009, ALTO developed Mobile Air Time Top Up for all telecommunication providers in Indonesia.

In November 2013, ALTO made a joint venture with Seven Bank, a Japanese ATM network, named PT. ATM. The goal is to developing ATM business in Indonesia.
