= Visa Electron =

Debit card

- The final Visa Electron acceptance logo from 2015 until 2024
- Product type: Debit card
- Current owner: Visa Inc.
- Introduced: 1985; 41 years ago
- Discontinued: April 13, 2024
- Related brands: Visa Debit
- Markets: Worldwide
- Tagline: "Always on"
- Website: www.visa.com

Visa Electron was a debit card product that used the Visa payment system. It was offered by issuing banks in every country with the exception of Canada, Australia, Argentina, Ireland and the United States. The difference between Visa Electron and Visa Debit, a similar product, is that payments with Visa Electron always require on-line electronic authorisation, and typically require that all the funds be available at the time of transfer, i.e., Visa Electron card accounts may not normally be overdrawn. On the other hand, most Visa Debit cards may be processed offline, without online authorisation, and may allow transfers exceeding available funds up to a certain limit. For that reason, Visa Electron cards are more commonly issued to younger customers or customers that have poor credit.

Online stores and all offline terminals do not support Visa Electron because their systems cannot check for the availability of funds. In addition to point of sale debit payments, the card also allows the holder to withdraw cash from automated teller machines (ATMs) using the Plus interbank network. Issuance of Visa Electron cards declined in the 2010s, with many banks replacing them with Visa Debit cards. Visa discontinued the product globally in 2024.

== Design ==
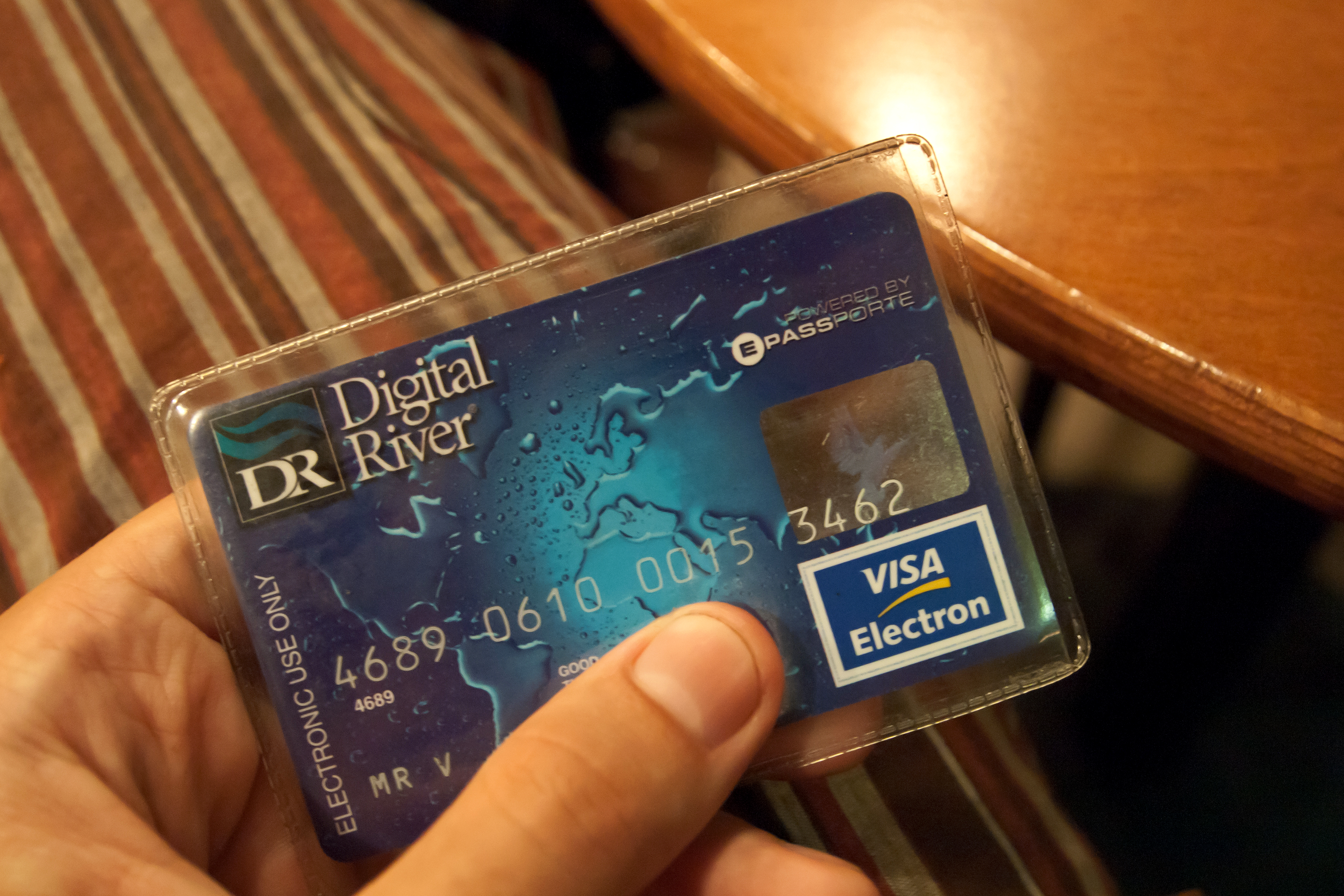
Visa Electron card with hologram and the logo used before 2005

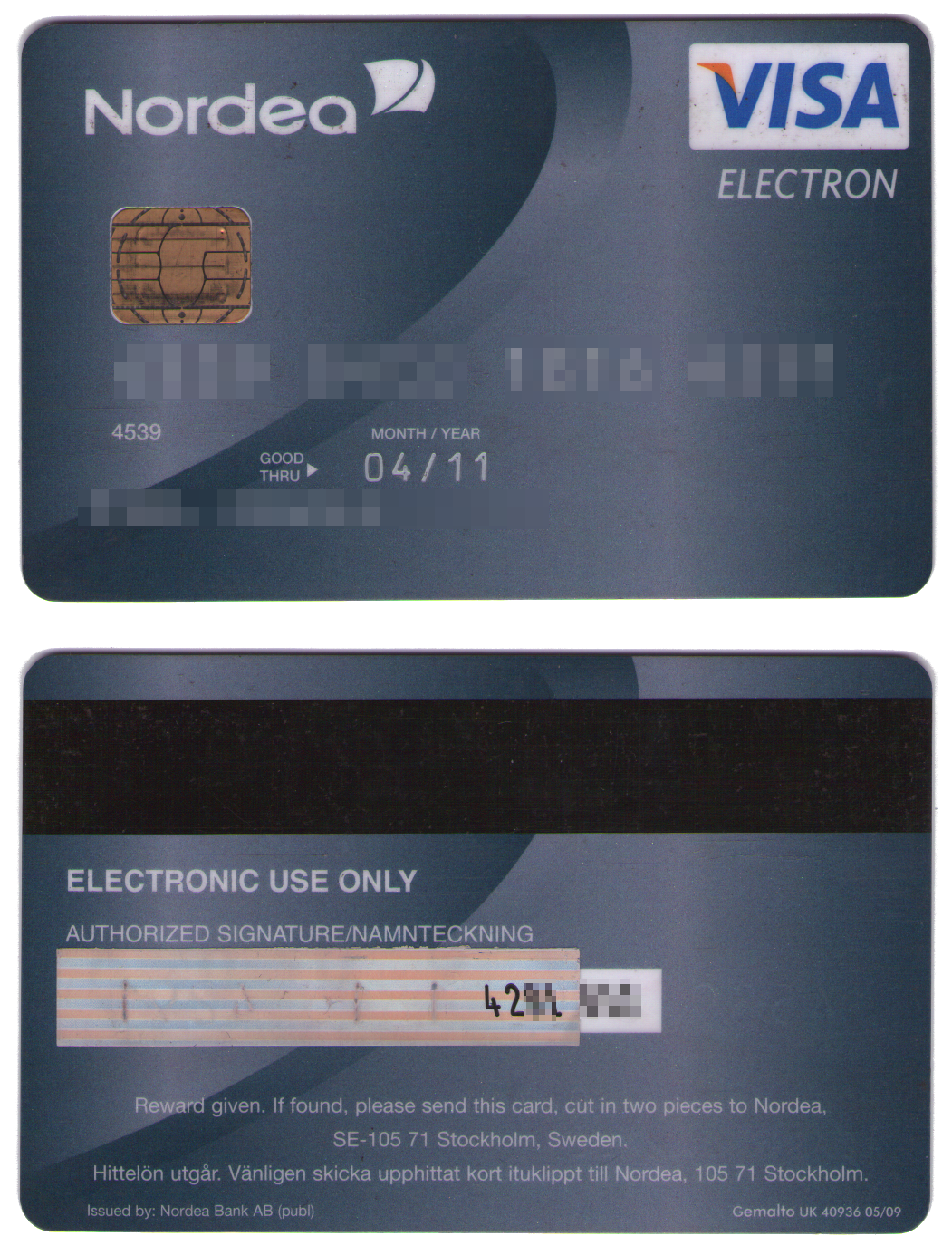
Visa Electron card without hologram and the logo used between 2005 and 2014

A Visa Electron logo, usually on the bottom right. Most Visa Electron cards do not have the dove hologram as on Visa credit and debit cards, but a few banks do include it. The card number and validity as well as cardholder name are printed rather than embossed, thus the card cannot be used in a card imprinter – for card-present transactions, the card requires a reader of magnetic stripe cards, EMV reader, or contactless payment terminal.
