= ATM Link =

Indonesian interbank network

PT Jalin Pembayaran Nusantara
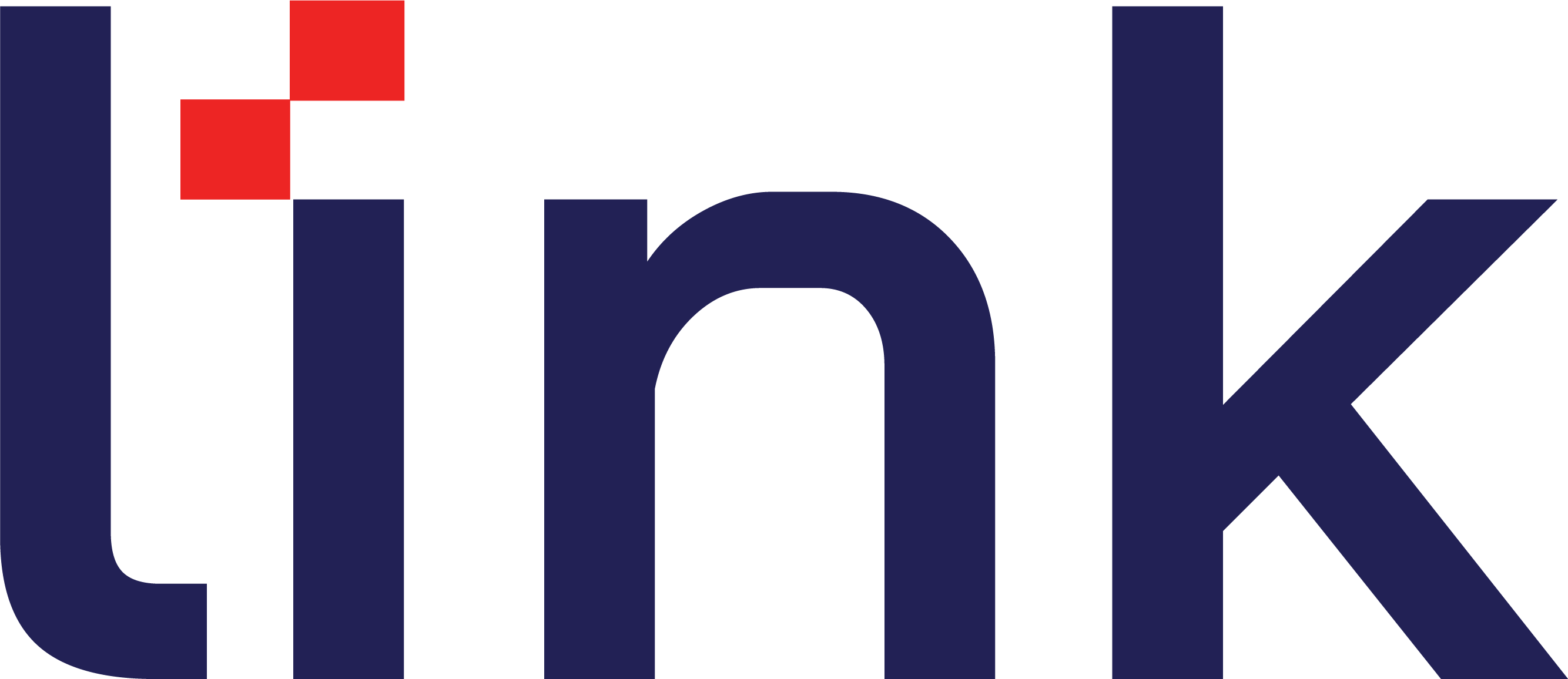
- Trade name: ATM Link
- Industry: Financial services
- Founded: 2001 (as interbank network); 3 November 2016; 9 years ago (as corporate entity)
- Headquarters: South Jakarta
- Area served: Indonesia
- Products: ATM and payment terminal
- Brands: Link
- Services: Interbank network
- Owner: Danareksa (67%); Telkom Indonesia (33%)
- Website: www.jalin.co.id

ATM Link (a shortened form of Lintas Network) is an interbank network serving Indonesian State-owned Banks Association (Himbara), comprising Bank Mandiri, Bank Rakyat Indonesia, Bank Negara Indonesia, and Bank Tabungan Negara. The network provides cash withdrawal and inquiry services for customers of member banks of Himbara.

== History ==
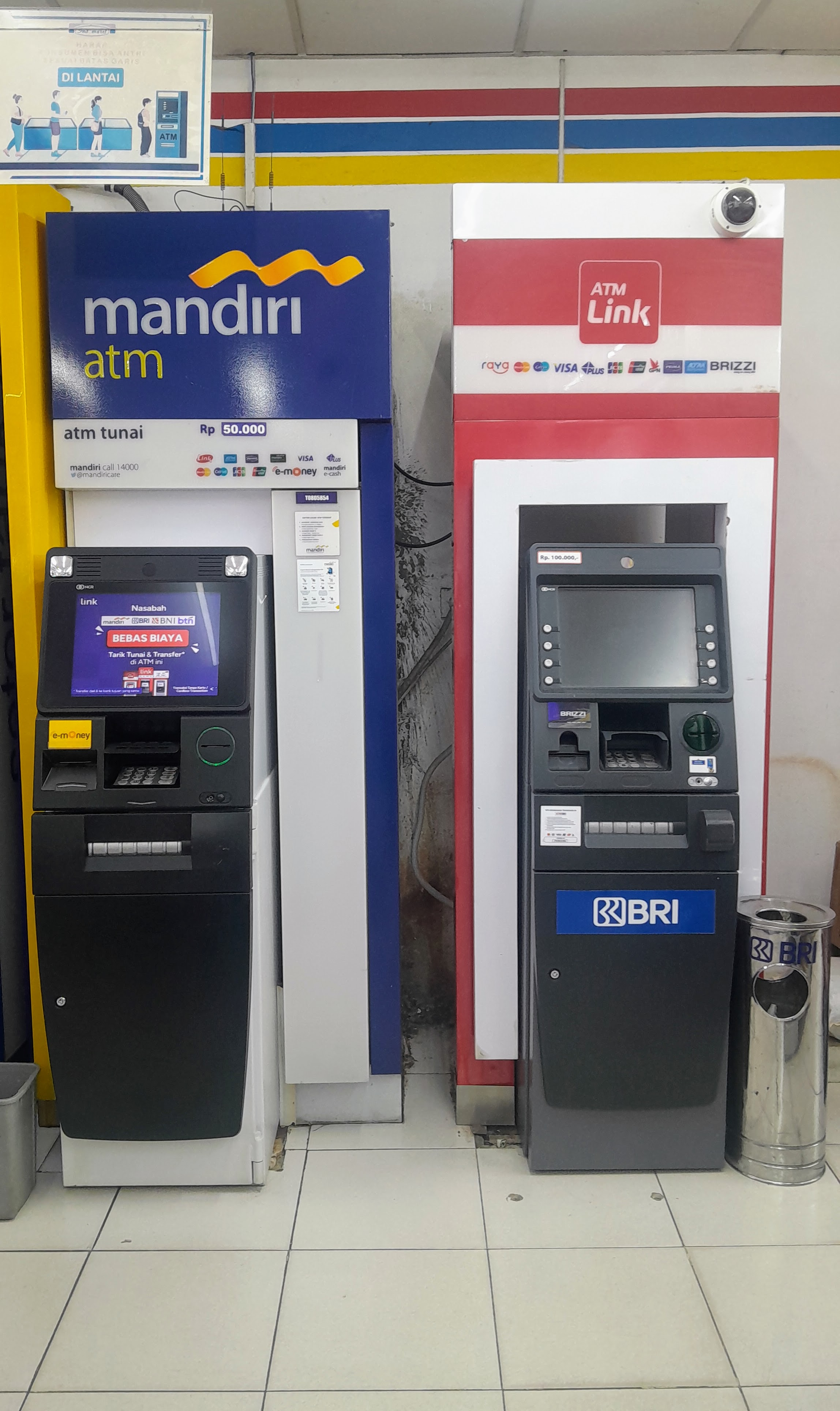
ATM Link machines, operated by Bank Mandiri and Bank Rakyat Indonesia (BRI) respectively. BRI ATM is using the unified ATM Link branding

The interbank network was formed as Link in 2001.

The corporate entity was formed by Deutsche Telekom in November 2016 after initiative from Ministry of State-Owned Enterprises and Himbara to develop and operate the ATM switching system for state-owned banks. In March 2017, the corporate entity commenced operation under the Link brand. The network later received license from Bank Indonesia as the switching network for national card network Gerbang Pembayaran Nasional (GPN, National Payment Gateway). The network later formed subsidiary PT Penyelesaian Transaksi Elektronik Nasional as the clearing house for transaction processed by GPN.

In June 2019 Danareksa acquired 67% shareholding of the company. The company later received license to process transaction within QRIS.

In 2023 an unified branding for ATM Link was launched with some individual member banks' ATMs rebranded with it.

== LinkAja ==
PT Fintek Karya Nusantara
- Trade name: LinkAja!
- Industry: Financial services
- Founded: June 30, 2019; 6 years ago
- Owners: Telkomsel (25%); Bank Mandiri (20%); Bank Rakyat Indonesia (20%); Bank Negara Indonesia (20%); Bank Tabungan Negara (7%); Pertamina (7%); Jiwasraya (1%); Danareksa (1%)
- Website: www.linkaja.id

LinkAja! is an Indonesian digital wallet service. The service was originally launched in 2007 by an Indonesian mobile operator Telkomsel as Telkomsel Cash, branded as TCASH. It is developed by PT Fintek Karya Nusantara, a company owned by various state-owned companies; including Telkomsel – itself a subsidiary of Telkom Indonesia, state-owned banks (Bank Mandiri, BRI, BNI, and BTN), Pertamina, Jiwasraya, and Danareksa.

On 26 March 2020, LinkAja partnered with Telcoin, an instant, low-cost blockchain-powered remittance service. This partnership is set to explore cashless opportunities in LinkAjas area of operation.
