= Landmark Credit Union =

- Type: Credit Union
- Industry: Financial services
- Founded: Milwaukee, Wisconsin (February 1933)
- Headquarters: Brookfield, Wisconsin, United States
- Number of locations: 35
- Area served: Wisconsin and Lake and McHenry Counties in Illinois
- Key people: Timothy Mackay (President and CEO)
- Products: Savings; checking; mortgages; investments; digital banking; mobile banking
- Revenue: $130 million (2019)
- Total assets: $8.2 billion; (2026)
- Owner: Its members
- Number of employees: 1020 (2025)
- Website: landmarkcu.com

Landmark Credit Union is an American credit union providing banking services in Wisconsin and Northern Illinois. It operates as a cooperative and is owned by its members. Landmark provides banking services including, savings accounts, checking accounts, mortgages and investments.

== History ==
In February 1933, employees Rex Chainbelt Company (later Rexnord Corporation) established Rex #2 Credit Union to provide financial services to company employes.

Over the years, the credit union changed names (Chabelco Credit Union, Rexnord Credit Union). Then, in 1985, the credit union extended its scope to people living or working within the greater Milwaukee area. This event prompted the name change to Landmark Credit Union.

Landmark has grown to more than 30 branches and has over $5 billion in total assets. It serves those who live and work in Southern and Northeastern Wisconsin, plus Lake and McHenry Counties in Illinois.

In 2026, Landmark Credit Union opened a live music venue in Milwaukee called Landmark Credit Union Live.

=== Mergers and Acquisitions ===
Hartford Savings Bank, Badger Campus Credit Union, Dodge Central Credit Union (2013); Horizon Credit Union, Co-operative Credit Union, People's Credit Union, American Credit Union (2012); Lifetime Credit Union, Allco Credit Union, First Security Credit Union (2009), WISCOR Credit Union (2008); Belle City Credit Union (2007); County Wide Credit Union (2000); CityFirst Credit Union (1998); Waukesha Credit Union (1989); Brookfield Metco Community Credit Union (1988); New Berlin Industrial Credit Union (1987); Lake Country Credit Union (1986)

== Membership Eligibility ==
Landmark Credit Union serves people living or working in Southern and Northeastern Wisconsin, plus Lake and McHenry Counties in Illinois, as well as immediate family members of all individuals eligible for membership. Immediate family is defined as spouse, parent, child, stepchild, sibling, stepsibling, grandparent or grandchild. This also includes stepparents and stepchildren.

Wisconsin Counties: Brown County, Calumet County, Columbia County, Dane County, Dodge County, Fond du Lac County, Green County, Green Lake County, Iowa County, Jefferson County, Kenosha County, Manitowoc County, Marquette County, Milwaukee County, Outagamie County, Ozaukee County, Racine County, Rock County, Sheboygan County, Walworth County, Washington County, Waukesha County, Winnebago County, Adams County, Door County, Grant County, Juneau County, Kewaunee County, Lafayette County, Oconto County, Richland County, Sauk County, Shawano County, Waupaca County, Waushara County.

Northeastern Illinois Counties: McHenry County, Lake County.
