= NCR Atleos =

American ATM business service provider

- Logo used since 2023

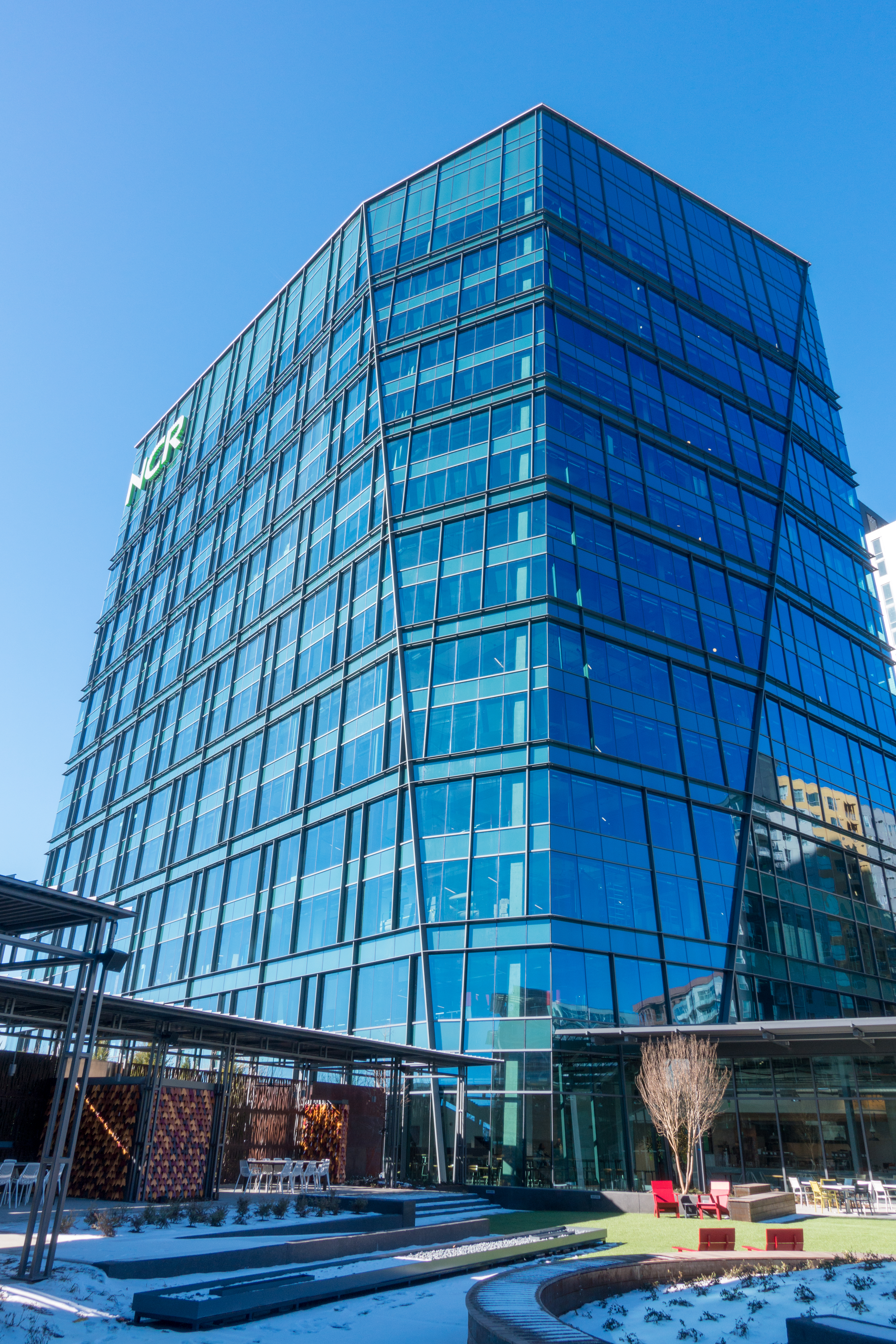
- Headquarters in Midtown Atlanta
- Formerly: National Cash Register; AT&T Global Information Solutions
- Type: Public
- Traded as: NYSE: NATL; S&P 600 component
- Industry: Information technology
- Founded: October 16, 2023; 2 years ago
- Headquarters: Atlanta, Georgia, U.S.
- Products: Automated teller machines; Professional services
- Revenue: ▲US$4.35 billion (2025)
- Net income: ▲US$162 million (2025)
- Website: ncratleos.com

NCR Atleos is an American ATM business service provider. This company specializes in ATM technology and related services, including ATM manufacturing, deployment, and maintenance. NCR Atleos is now the world's largest provider of ATMs and ATM services, according to some sources. The company is based in Atlanta, USA.

== History ==
On September 16, 2022, NCR announced it would split its Digital Commerce and ATM businesses in two separate companies. The split was completed on October 16, 2023. In October 2023, NCR Corporation was split into two independent public companies: NCR Voyix legally succeeded NCR Corporation, while the ATM business was spun-off as NCR Atleos. Their names were unveiled on July 24, 2023, with Digital Commerce business being named NCR Voyix and ATM business being named NCR Atleos.

On February 26, 2026, NCR published a press release announcing that Brink's will acquire NCR Atleos for around $6.6 billion.
