= Banestes =

Brazilian Bank

Banestes S.A. - Banco do Estado do Espírito Santo
- Type: Sociedade Anônima
- Traded as: B3: BEES3, BEES4
- Industry: Finance and Insurance
- Founded: 1937
- Headquarters: Vitória, Brazil
- Key people: Michel Sarkis, (CEO)
- Products: Banking
- Number of employees: 2,358
- Website: www.banestes.com.br

Banestes (Banco do Estado do Espirito Santo) is a Brazilian state owned bank responsible for the public execution of loans for the state of Espírito Santo, it is one of the state's major instruments of economic development.

The bank was established in 1937, and has operations outside its home state and an office in São Paulo. It is one of the few state banks that survived a wave of privatisation and mergers that occurred in the later part of the 20th century.
