= STAR (interbank network) =

American interbank network

- Operating area: United States
- Members: ±5,700
- ATMs: ±2,000,000
- Founded: 1984
- Owner: First Data Corporation
- Website: www.star.com

STAR is an American interbank network. It is the largest interbank network in the United States, with 2 million ATMs, 134 million cardholders and over 5,700 participating financial institutions. The STAR Network began in 1984 and was acquired by First Data Corporation in 2003. The network is owned and operated by STAR Networks, a subsidiary company of First Data.

== Mergers ==
The network has existed since 1984, and has incorporated several others, mostly in the 2000s:

- Alert
- BankMate
- Cactus
- Cash Station
- Explore
- HONOR
- Money Access Center (MAC)
- MOST
- VIA

== See also ==
- ATM usage fees
