= ATM usage fees =

Fees charged for ATM use

ATM usage fees are what many banks and interbank networks charge for the use of their automated teller machines (ATMs). In some cases, these fees are assessed solely for non-members of the bank; in other cases, they apply to all users. There is usually a higher fee for the use of White-label ATMs rather than bank-owned ATMs.

Two types of consumer charges exist: the surcharge, and foreign fee. The surcharge fee may be imposed by the ATM owner (the bank or Independent ATM deployer) and will be charged to the consumer using the machine. The foreign or transaction fee is a fee charged by the card issuer (financial institution, stored value provider) to the consumer for conducting a transaction outside of their network of machines, in the case of a financial institution.

== Oceania ==
=== Australia ===
Several ATM networks are operated in Australia; the largest are: Commonwealth Bank / Bankwest network with 3,400 machines, Westpac / St George Bank / BankSA / Bank of Melbourne with 2,800 machines, ANZ with 2,300 machines, the rediATM network with 1,800 machines, and National Australia Bank with 900 machines, The ATMs of CommBank, Westpac, ANZ, NAB and others are free to use. ING Australia, which does not operate its ATMs nor have a branch network, reimburses any ATM fees of customers who deposit A$1,000 per month as part of a loyalty program. Australians made more than 250 million ATM withdrawals from banks other than their own in 2016.

In September 2017, the "Big Four" banks announced they would abolish non-customer ATM usage fees. The Commonwealth Bank was the first to make the announcement, shortly followed by the three other major banks: ANZ, NAB and Westpac. The rediATM network charges up to A$2.50 for domestic cards and A$5.00 for international cards.

== Americas ==
=== Brazil ===
In Brazil, banks such as Caixa Econômica Federal, Banco do Brasil, Banco Bradesco, Banco Itaú and Banco Santander operate their own nationwide ATM networks. These ATMs can be found in many locations such as the bank branch itself, kiosks spread throughout a city or even supermarkets, gas stations, shopping malls and post offices, making it very convenient for the customer to make withdrawals and check balances without incurring any fees. There are also no denial fees (i.e. when trying to withdraw more money than what's available in an account), as Brazilian businesses cannot charge for services not rendered. However, fees are assessed if there is excessive usage of the ATMs (i.e. one makes more withdrawals than what's allowed by their monthly maintenance fee). Fees and limits can be checked at the Brazilian Banking Federation (Febraban) website.

Brazilian banks have several partnerships in place in order to extend their coverage:

- Correspondente bancário (banking agent) - a partnership with an establishment, who then use a small wireless ATM (much like a wireless EFTPOS) to process transactions for the bank, such as payments, deposits, and withdrawals. The use of a banking agent typically does not generate any fees. However, fees are assessed if there is excessive usage of the ATMs (i.e. one makes more operations than what's allowed by their monthly maintenance fee).
- Interbank network - there are ATM interbank networks such as Banco24Horas that not generate charges fees for use. However, fees are assessed if there is excessive usage of the ATMs (i.e. one makes more operations than what's allowed by their monthly maintenance fee).
- Cash withdrawal with a Visa debit card - Brazilian acquirer Cielo (formerly known as VisaNet) offers Visa debit card holders an option to withdraw a small amount of cash (up to R$100, approx. US$30) when paying for merchandise at any Visa-accepting store. Store owners then hand over the money to the customer at the checkout. While the purchase itself generates fees for the business (like any other credit or debit card transaction), the money withdrawal does not and is reimbursed in full.

=== Canada ===
A short description of the fee structure one experiences while using Canadian ATMs can be found at the Interac website, while the Financial Consumer Agency of Canada maintains a chart of the fees typically charged for use of ATMs in Canada.

There are two main ATM networks in Canada:

- Interac ATMs - Most Canadian financial institutions are members of Interac, a multi-bank ATM network founded by RBC, CIBC, Scotiabank, TD, and Desjardins Group in 1984. Before the presence of white-label ATMs, most Canadian customers were only charged the standard Interac network transaction fee when a customer was using an ATM not provided by the bank that held their account. As the Interac network was opened up to more independent sales organizations (ISOs) and the potential for additional revenue from service fees was made available, most banks elected to impose the service fee in addition to the revenue that was generated from the Interac fee.
- The Exchange is a multi-bank ATM network. It originated in the northwestern United States before expanding to Canada in 1983. As of 2017, many Canadian credit unions, along with The Alterna Bank, Alterna Savings, Canadian Western Bank, Citibank, HSBC Bank Canada, Manulife Bank of Canada, First Nations Bank of Canada and National Bank provide surcharge-free ATM access to members of other participating financial institutions through the network.

=== Colombia ===
Fees and withdrawal amounts differ by network (i.e. Mastercard or Visa) and by the issuing card. Davividenda gets the most reports for having zero fees for withdrawals. BBVA has low withdrawal limits.

=== United States ===
In 1988, Valley Bank of Nevada introduced a separate transaction fee to "foreign cardholders" (meaning holders of ATM cards not issued by Valley Bank) for withdrawals at Valley Bank ATMs, particularly those located in/near Las Vegas casinos. Eventually, various regional ATM networks, and ultimately the national networks, Plus and Cirrus, permitted ATM surcharging.

Before 1996, foreign ATM fees averaged $1.01 USD nationally, according to a 2001 report from the US-based State Public Interest Research Group.

As banks and third parties realized the profit potential, they raised the fees. ATM fees now commonly reach $3.00, and can be as high as $6.00, or even higher in cash-intensive places like bars and casinos, in cases where fees are paid both to the bank (for using a "foreign" ATM) and the ATM owner (the so-called "surcharge") total withdrawal fees could potentially reach $11. Independent sales organizations ("ISO"s) are the driving force in ATM deployment in the U.S. today, representing over 60% of the 396,000 ATMs nationwide. Some have expressed concerns that the U.S. market is becoming too saturated, spreading the resulting fee pool too thin, which may result in a future net decrease in the number of machines. Other media reports indicate that growth in ATM usage has decreased, possibly in relation to the number of fees imposed by banks.

According to Bank Call Reports, JPMorgan Chase, Bank of America and Wells Fargo earned more than $1.1 billion in 2016 from ATM fees. The average fee for using an out-of-network ATM has reached $4.57 in 2016 and this is the 10th straight year of increases, according to Bankrate. By 2019, the average total out-of-network ATM fees had increased to $4.72.

Another type of charge a customer may face is a "Denial Fee", where a customer is charged a fee for attempting to withdraw more money than they are either allowed through their daily withdrawal limit or by having insufficient funds in their account.

== Asia ==
=== Bangladesh ===
Bangladesh has multiple ATM networks. Dutch-Bangla Bank has the largest network and the most member banks. If one has a Bank debit card, customers are charged BDT 200 yearly for ATM network use.

Dutch-Bangla Bank has separate agreements with local and international banks. Under these agreements, Dutch-Bangla Bank charges member banks BDT 10 (US$0.092) per transaction. Because this is a low amount, member banks often add an extra profit margin.

=== Hong Kong ===
There are three ATM networks in Hong Kong: ETC (HSBC and Hang Seng Bank only), JETCO (all remaining banks) and ÆON. ATM use is free of charge when the card is issued by its respective network. Otherwise, HKD$0–30 is paid for service charges for out-of-network cards.

=== India ===
In 2014, the Reserve Bank of India (RBI), India's central bank and financial regulator, issued a directive on request from large ATM network and card-issuing banks which expressed concern about the growing cost of ATM network operations, large cash outflows, and other problems. In fact, customers of the same bank withdrawing more than five times in month were sought to be charged. Present directive reduces Free transactions per month from five to three with revised charges of INR 20 plus taxes levied per transaction as ATM transaction fee.

The number of ATMs, which stood at a little over 27,000 as of the end of March 2007, has increased to over 160,000 across the country by the end of March 2014. During the same period, POS infrastructure has increased from 330,000 to 1,065,000 terminals. Meanwhile, White Label ATMs (WLAs) have also been introduced in the country with the objective of increasing the ATM density and also building the rural and semi-urban ATM infrastructure.

In 2007, the Reserve Bank of India (RBI), the country's central bank, had issued a directive to all commercial banks to freeze ATM charges and, with effect from 1 April 2009, abolish ATM service charges altogether. Since 2009, customers of any licensed bank are able to use the ATMs of other banks without paying a service charge. Earlier, banks charged between ₹ 10 and ₹ 35 per reciprocal transaction. A person holding a card of other banks can withdraw amount from other bank ATMs but the number of transactions is limited to 5; i.e., on the 6th transaction the person is charged up to ₹ 21.

However, banks can still surcharge for items such as credit card ATM cash advances and at foreign ATMs. In addition, RBI imposes significant foreign exchange restrictions on the use of Indian debit VISA/Mastercard abroad. For example, Indian debit VISA cards are routinely marked "Valid in India and Nepal only" due to the country's restrictive foreign exchange reserve policy.

=== Indonesia ===
In Indonesia, banks generally do not charge a fee for ATM usage. However, when an ATM card is used outside the home ATM network, service charge will apply.

=== Iran ===
The Shetab Banking System is an electronic banking clearance and automated payments system used in Iran. The system was introduced in 2002 with the intention of creating a uniform backbone for the Iranian banking system to handle ATM, POS and other card-based transactions. There are no charges for money withdrawal in this network. Transferring money between two accounts in a same bank is mostly free (for some banks may incur a small charge of IRR 250) but between different banks costs from 5,000 to 39,600 (for amounts of 10,000 to 150,000,000) for instant transactions, IRR 2,000 to 25,000 for "Paya" transactions, and checking the account balance costs IRR 1,200 for other banks' cards. Other services are currently free.

=== Japan ===
In Japan, usually any ATM offers free withdrawal for its respective account holders. Business weekday from morning to late evening means a free transaction (withdrawal, deposit, balance statements, sometimes bank transfers). Beyond this time limit or even on weekends / public holidays, the ATM charges fees to make a transaction.

=== Malaysia ===
In Malaysia, ATM usage is free of charge but users may be required to pay a fee when used outside the home network and banks charge a fee of RM 8 to RM 24 annually for a normal savings account.

Under Malaysia's Basic Saving Account scheme the fee is waived but the customer is limited to only eight free cash withdrawals, after that, banks will charge a fee of RM0.50 to RM1 for every withdrawal until the following month.

Also, under the Malaysian Electronic Payment System (MEPS), users can withdraw cash from participating banks for a fee of RM 1 per withdraw. Users can also transfer their fund to another bank via IBFT (Instant Bank Fund Transfer) at a fee of RM 0.30 to RM 0.50 or via IBG (inter-bank giro) at RM 0.10 . Another program called HOUSe by locally incorporated foreign banks in Malaysia also have their own network for cash withdrawals from participating banks. Users of local banks are also considered MEPS users by default and users of locally incorporated foreign banks are considered HOUSe users. MEPS users attempting to withdraw cash from HOUSe networks are subjected to a fee of RM 4 and vice versa. Some banks allow cross-border cash withdrawals, but may charge a fee of up to RM 24 per withdrawal, depending on the kind of ATM network users choose.

=== Pakistan ===
In Pakistan, banks usually charge a fee of PKR 23.44 (equivalent to 8.2 cents USD) for each non-user's ATM cash withdrawal. These fees are levied chiefly to offset banks' own costs at par only, without any profit margin whatsoever.

There are two ATM networks operational in the country, 1LINK hosted by a consortium of banks, and MNET. All Pakistani banks are members of 1LINK switch as per the mandate of the State Bank of Pakistan, the country's central bank. Some banks, absorb the costs entirely, and offer their customers totally free withdrawals at all ATMs countrywide, including Azad Jammu and Kashmir.

ATM charges for cash withdrawal from other Bank ATMs (possibly tax exclusive):

- Allied Bank Limited: Rs.23.44.
- Bank Alfalah Limited: Rs.23.44 with some account types exempt (domestic), international: Rs. 300 or 3% of withdrawal amount, whichever is higher.
- Bank Al-Habib Limited: Rs. 23.44 (domestic), international: Rs. 200 or 2% of withdrawal amount, whichever is higher.
- Habib Bank Limited: Rs. 23.44 with Work Account and Freedom Account exempt, was ~16.5 by end-2019.
- Habib Metropolitan Bank Limited: Rs. 23.44 (domestic), 3% (international).
- JS Bank Limited: Rs. 23.44 (domestic), international: Rs. 1,000 or 4% of withdrawal amount, whichever is higher.
- MCB Bank Limited: Rs. 23.44 (domestic), international: 2%.
- Meezan Bank: Rs.23.44.
- Standard Chartered: Rs. 23.44 (1-Link), Rs. 15 (MNET), 8% (international).
- United Bank Limited: Rs.23.44 (domestic), international: 0 (Pay Pak), 4.5% (Pay Pak/UPI and all other cards).

=== Philippines ===
In the Philippines, there is a ₱250 charge from local banks when using an international ATM card, in addition to the originating bank's charges. HSBC Bank is the only bank in the Philippines without a ₱250 fee for overseas bank cards.

Banks currently charge a flat fee ranging from ₱16 to ₱20 per withdrawal transaction for customers who use an ATM card in other bank's ATMs.

=== Sri Lanka ===
In Sri Lanka banks usually charge a fee of LKR 5.00 (US$0.03) for the users of the bank (which provides the ATM) and LKR 15.00 (US$0.08) to LKR 60.00 (US$0.3) per non user's bank withdrawal of cash from the machine. Most ATMs are connected to the national LankaPay interbank network. If the user used their credit card to withdraw money, banks will charge from LKR 300.00 (US$1.51) to LKR 900.00 (US$4.53) per transaction.

=== Thailand ===
In Thailand, there is no fee for domestic same-bank same-province transaction. However, customers usually pay an ATM annual fee of ฿200, plus a one-off card fee of ฿100 and convenience fee for withdrawal or balance inquiry at other bank ATM or at a province other than the province where the account is opened. On 23 September 2010, the Bank of Thailand (BOT) announced an ATM fee ceiling framework which came into full effect one year later. Most of the banks will allow customer to have four withdrawal or balance inquiry transactions for free provided that the ATM is located in the same province with the account, then charges up to ฿10 per transaction for interbank same-province ATM usage. Inter-provincial fund transfer or withdrawal fees are capped at ฿20 per transaction as a result of BOT 2010 reform.

However, banks are now pushing for high annual fee card by combining personal assurance (PA) into their cards. The annual fee of PA card can be more than three times for the ordinary card (typically ฿200 for a debit card). Many customers are often told that basic cards have run out of stock and they can only choose the PA card. In some cases, customers not willing to subscribe to ATM service and pay the card fees are not allowed to open an account.

For a foreign card, the ATM service fee is ฿150 (Aeon Bank), and ฿220 for all other banks. Cash withdrawals in the bank office ("cash advance") typically do not have any fees on top of what the issuer bank may charge.

== Europe ==
=== Austria ===
Cash withdrawals are free for any owner of an Austrian Maestro card at a bank. Some independent ATMs – 67 out of 8,500 as of 2016 – charge a small fee (€1.95 in 2016). By law, a warning is given when a fee is charged.

In July 2016 it was discussed if a law should forbid these fees or the fee must be displayed clearly during the transaction.

Very few, small banks charge an extra fee when one of their own customers uses a different bank's ATM.

=== Finland ===
Cash withdrawals are free for any owner of a Finnish bank card or Visa Electron cards on ATM brand "Otto." which is the largest ATM network in Finland. There are smaller rivals which have fees. "Otto." ATMs accept also Visa, MasterCard, American Express and Diners Club credit cards. They also belong to Maestro, Cirrus and Plus networks. Fees depend on card issuer. Some banks do charge fees after a given number of withdrawals within a month.

=== Germany ===
German banks generally charge fees for out-of-network withdrawals, both within the national Girocard debit card/ATM scheme as well as when using a debit card's Maestro, V-Pay, Debit Mastercard or Visa Debit facility abroad.

Fees for withdrawals within the Girocard scheme are all implemented as surcharges (direktes Kundenentgelt) which go from €1.95 up to €5.00 or higher and must be displayed to the customer before the money is given out. Almost all ATMs in Germany are connected to the national Girocard interbank network. The ATM owners do usually join one of the ATM groups that mutually lower or waive fees, so that customers can withdraw free of charge. The most extensive network of ATMs belongs to the savings banks associations ("Sparkassen") with 24,600 ATMs. Most private banks are either member of the Cash Group (7,000 ATMs owned by the major banks) or Cash Pool (2,500 ATMs owned by smaller banks) – they are usually found in city centers. The credit unions ("Volksbanken" and "Raiffeisenbanken") provide around 18,000 ATMs and are associated in the BankCard ServiceNetz, very often in smaller towns and villages, but less frequently available in the big cities.

Surcharges for cash withdrawals using an international card scheme (such as Maestro International, Visa or Mastercard) are uncommon at German ATMs. Instead, an interchange fee is paid by the cardholder's bank to the ATM operator. Cardholders themselves are charged by their bank. Neither the interbank fee nor the cardholder-facing fee are displayed during the transaction.

Some German banks such as Deutsche Kreditbank, ING-DiBa and Consorsbank are issuing Visa cards to their customers by default, in addition to or even as a replacement for a domestic debit card (Girocard), providing free cash withdrawals to their customers through the international networks, subject to certain conditions such as a minimum withdrawal amount.

=== Ireland ===
Section 149 of the Consumer Credit Act, 1995 requires a credit institution to notify the Central Bank of Ireland of every proposal to increase a previously notified charge or to impose any charge in relation to the provision of a service to a customer that has not been previously notified to the Central Bank. Not all ATMs are operated by credit institutions. Third party charges are not subject to this notification process. The government imposes a 12 cent stamp duty fee per ATM withdraw in the Republic on debit/ATM cards charged at the end of a calendar year, capped at €2.50 for cards that have only been used at ATMs and €5.00 for cards used at ATMs and point-of-sale.

=== Netherlands ===
Cash withdrawals are usually free for an owner of a Dutch debit card, both within the Netherlands and in the rest of the European Union. Cash withdrawals from another bank in the Netherlands are limited to a maximum of once a day and a lower limit per transaction. The one transaction per day limit generally does not apply to withdrawals outside the country. Up to €2,300 may be withdrawn per cashpoint.

=== Norway ===
No ATM normally surcharges. However, most major card issuers will levy cash-advance fees unless the client pays a higher annual fee for the card. Some cards have no ATM fees, but these are the exception – like Skandiabanken (Sbanken) Visa and Gebyrfri Visa, both smaller foreign-based banks.

=== Poland ===
There are few but extensive independent ATM operators in Poland (e.g. Euronet, ITCARD owner of Planet Cash ATM network, eCard, Global Cash) as well as smaller bank-owned networks. Fees depend on inter-bank agreements and are explicitly stated in card contract. Typically withdrawals from own and allied networks are free while from competitor's machines are subject to a percentage (3-4%) with constant minimum fee, e.g. 5 PLN (~$1.4). In 2013 ATM fee for using other domestic machine was decreased to 1.2/1.3 PLN per transaction. Premium accounts often come without any withdrawal fees, albeit at higher recurring cost. As of 2010 many banks offer optional contracts on "free" withdrawals from any ATM at flat monthly fee, usually priced similar to one withdrawal. The maximum amount that can be withdrawn in one operation is usually 30 or 40 notes (~US$1,000), varying with the type of machine, ATM management system and banknote denominations used.

=== Portugal ===
All Multibanco withdrawals and payments in Portugal are free. Recent European Union directives allowed merchants and banks to charge the customers for transactions, but the government approved a law that forbids charging any kind of fees.

=== Spain ===
There are significant variation in charges applied. A card issued by a Spanish bank will normally expect to incur a fee up to €1 on each ATM withdrawal, where the transaction is conducted on an ATM operated and owned by the customer's own bank.

However, outside this situation, there is anecdotal evidence of significantly higher charges being applied where third-party owner/operated ATMs are used, including those operated/owned by other Spanish banks. These may be in reported but unverified cases to be as high as 5% of the value withdrawn.

An effort is currently being made to research, identify and quantify the structure and nature of what, from this anecdotal evidence, appear in some cases to be excessive charges. The case is complicated because the fees can originate from the ATM operator, or/and the customers own bank, for as "processing fees".

=== Sweden ===
In Sweden, most banks issue debit cards for an annual or monthly fee which includes free withdrawals in Sweden and within the eurozone. However, customers are subject to a fee if using a cash machine elsewhere. Some cards from some banks are, however, subject to fees also when used in the eurozone and some Swedish cash machines. Most of these cards are issued by savings banks.

=== Switzerland ===
Fees are not usually charged for withdrawals at a banks' own ATMs, but may be at those of other banks. For example, as of 2019 UBS do not charge for withdrawals at other banks whereas Credit Suisse charge 2 CHF per withdrawal. Sometimes, banks provide the cardholder with 10, 12 or 24 free withdrawals, especially if the bank is a small one, with few ATMs. Most Swiss banks hand out Maestro cards to their customers, in most cases for an annual fee of around 40 CHF, so that any ATM can be used.

=== United Kingdom ===
During the 1980s the number of banks and building societies charging issuer fees (i.e. charging fees to their own customers when they used another operator's cash machines) gradually increased. However, in 1990 Barclays announced they were introducing an acquirer fee for all non-Barclays cardholders at their cash machines. This would result in "double charging", where the customer was charged by both their card issuer and the machine operator. Public reaction against this proposal was very strong and a campaign launched by Nationwide Building Society and the UK tabloid newspapers resulted in issuer fees being removed altogether.

Interchange fees remained. These are paid by the card issuer to the cash machine operator to cover the cost of the transaction. Their cost is absorbed by the card issuer and not directly passed on to the end customer.

In 1999 the UK cash machine network LINK opened membership to so-called independent cash machine operators (IADs); organizations which do not issue cards. IADs initially focused on the pay-to-use market, where the customer covers the cost of the transaction directly and this, coupled with a low-cost business model, meant that the number of pay-to-use cash machines rose rapidly, peaking in 2007 at just over 27,000 cash machines.

Most of these machines are in low footfall locations such as convenience shops, garages, nightclubs and pubs. The fee charged in 2005 was usually between £1.00 and £1.50, but occasionally they have been known to charge up to £5 and £10.

Rules regarding signage on pay-to-use machines were introduced in 2005 and enhanced in 2006 and since 2007 the number of pay-to-use cash machines has fallen. By the end of 2010 there were around 21,000 cash machines.

The large numbers of free-to-use cash machines and the low average number of transactions at pay-to-use cash machines means that 97% of cash withdrawals in the UK remain free of charge. As of 2016, there were about 54,000 free to use cash machines, of which 23,600 were provided by independent suppliers, and 16,000 cash machines that charge for withdrawals.

== See also ==
- ATM card
- Financial transaction
- Global ATM Alliance
- Point of sale
- Unavailable funds fee
