= PRIMA (Indonesia) =

Indonesian interbank networks

PRIMA PT Rintis Sejahtera
- Operating area: Indonesia; Singapore
- Members: 30
- ATMs: 90,000+
- Founded: 2005
- Owner: Salim Group
- Website: www.jaringanprima.co.id

PRIMA is an interbank network operating in Indonesia and Singapore, owned by PT Rintis Sejahtera, a satellite communication service provider. Previously, it was known as the ATM BCA network, serving Bank Central Asia.

== Services ==
PRIMA provides interbank transaction services including ATM switching, debit card processing, QRIS (QR code payments), cross-border transactions, and electronic money top-up services. In 2023, PT Rintis Sejahtera connected additional member banks to Indonesia's BI-FAST real-time payment system.

== Members ==
- Bank Central Asia
- Bank Muamalat
- Bank Jabar Banten (bjb)
- Bank Mayapada
- Bank Ekonomi
- Bank Mega
- The Bank of Tokyo-Mitsubishi, Ltd. Jakarta Branch
- Bank Bukopin
- Bank Rakyat Indonesia
- Bank Sumsel
- Bank Permata
- Bank Bumi Arta
- Royal Bank of Scotland Indonesia, before ABN AMRO
- Bank Nusantara Parahyangan
- Bank Jasa Jakarta
- Bank BPD Jateng
- Bank OCBC NISP
- Bank BCA Syariah
- Bank BPD Kaltim
- Bank Victoria International
- Bank Pundi Indonesia
- Bank Maspion
- Bank Negara Indonesia
- Rabobank Indonesia
- Commonwealth Bank Indonesia
- Bank Mandiri Syariah
- Bank Mega Syariah
- Bank Mandiri
- CIMB Niaga
- Bank Mutiara
- UOB Indonesia
- Bank KEB Hana Indonesia
