= Interbank network =

Computer network allowing ATM cards to work between different banks

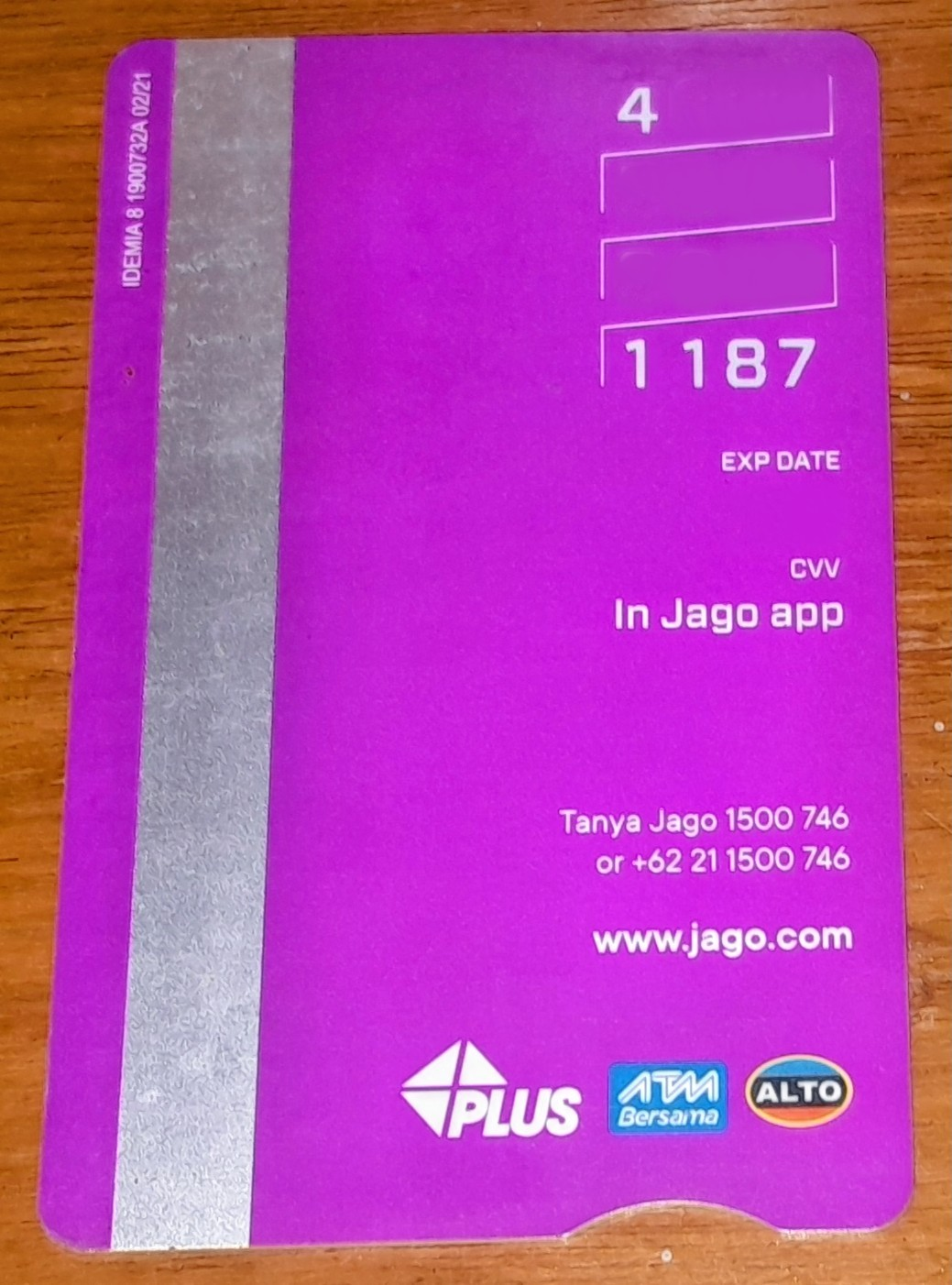
Example of an ATM card with global and local interbank networks, they are Plus, ATM Bersama, and ALTO

An interbank network, also known as an ATM consortium or ATM network, is a computer network that enables ATM cards issued by a financial institution that is a member of the network to be used to perform ATM transactions through ATMs that belong to another member of the network.

However, the functions which may be performed at the network ATM vary. For example, special services, such as the purchase of mobile phone airtime, may be available to own-bank but not to network ATM cardholders. Furthermore, the network ATM owner may charge a fee for use of network cards (in addition to any fees imposed by the own-bank).

Interbank networks enable ATM cardholders to have access to ATMs of other banks that are members of the network when their own bank's ATM is unavailable. This is especially convenient for travelers traveling abroad, where multinational interbank networks, like Plus or Cirrus, are widely available.

Interbank networks also permit, through different means, the use of ATM cards at a point of sale through the use of a special EFTPOS terminal where ATM cards are treated as debit cards.

== Around the world ==
=== Major economies ===
| Major economy | Interbank network name | Real-time gross settlement payment system |
|---|---|---|
| Australia | Electronic Funds Transfer at Point Of Sale (EFTPOS) | Reserve Bank Information & Transfer System (RITS) |
| Bangladesh | Bangladesh Electronic Funds Transfer Network (BEFTN), National Payment Switch Bangladesh (NPSB) | Bangladesh - Real Time Gross Settlement System (BD-RTGS) |
| Canada | Interac | Large Value Transfer System (LVTS) |
| China | China UnionPay | High-Value Payment System (HVPS) |
| France | Groupement des cartes bancaires CB | T2 |
| Germany | Girocard | T2 |
| Italy | Bancomat | T2 |
| India | National Financial Switch (NFS), Banks ATM Network and Customer Services (BANCS), Cashnet, CashTree, RuPay | Reserve Bank of India - Real Time Gross Settlement (RBI-RTGS) |
| Nigeria | Interswitch | Nigeria Interbank Settlement System (NIBSS) |
| Japan | Yucho | Bank of Japan Financial Network System (BOJ-NET) |
| South Africa | SASWITCH (BankservAfrica) | South African Multiple Option Settlement (SAMOS) |
| United Kingdom | LINK | Clearing House Automated Payment System (CHAPS) |
| United States | Allpoint, New York Currency Exchange (NYCE), Pulse, STAR, MoneyPass | Fedwire |

The payment card industry (PCI) denotes the debit, credit, prepaid, e-purse, ATM, and POS cards and associated businesses. Major brands used by the above interbank networks list by asset value.

| Card brand | Total assets (US$ billion) |
|---|---|
| China Union Pay | 208 |
| American Express | 153 |
| Discover Financial Services | 69 |
| Visa International | 40 |
| MasterCard Worldwide | 14 |
| Japan Credit Bureau | 11 |

=== Brazil ===
In Brazil, the major interbank network is the Banco24Horas network.

=== Caribbean ===
In the Caribbean, the major interbank network is the ATH network. Most banks issue dual ATH and MasterCard/Visa cards, using the ATH network for ATM transactions and MasterCard/Visa for EFTPOS transactions. Some banks (such as BanReservas) issue ATH-only cards which use the ATH network for both ATM and EFTPOS transactions.

=== Egypt ===
In Egypt, Meeza is Egypt's national payment network. It is part of the country's effort to promote digital financial inclusion and modernize the payment system. Meeza facilitates card payments, including debit and prepaid cards, and connects Egyptian banks for electronic payments. It serves as an interbank network that allows seamless transactions across various banks and financial institutions in Egypt.

=== Germany ===
In Germany Girocard interbank network provides debit card service connecting virtually all German ATMs and banks.

=== Indonesia ===
In Indonesia, there are a number of ATM networks. Transfers between accounts is also possible by using these networks, even to an account in a different network; all one needs is the Bank code of the destination bank and the account number.

- ALTO is one of the earliest ATM networks.
- ATM Bersama.
- ATM Link is a network that consists of 4 state owned banks: Bank Mandiri, Bank Rakyat Indonesia, Bank Negara Indonesia, and Bank Tabungan Negara.
- PRIMA, with BCA (Bank Central Asia) as one of its well-known members. It is also capable of doubling as an EFTPOS (Electronic Funds Transfer at Point of Sale) network by using BCA's own EFTPOS network (Debit BCA).

=== Japan ===
There are many Electronic funds transfer interbank networks in Japan.

- Major networks include BANCS (urban bank) and YUCHO (Japan Post Bank).
- Minor networks include ACS (local bank), SOCS (trust bank), LONGS (long term bank), SCS (secondary local bank), SINKIN-NETCASH (Shinkin bank), SANCS (credit union), ROCS (Labour Bank), and JABANK-NET (Norinchukin Bank).

Inter-network banking funds transfer is case-by-case. Yucho is the only network that accepts cards from worldwide networks such as Cirrus and PLUS.

=== Philippines ===
BancNet (also spelled Bancnet) is a Philippine-based interbank network connecting the ATM networks of local and offshore banks, and the largest interbank network in the Philippines in terms of the number of member banks and annual transactions.

BancNet is also the exclusive gateway of China's UnionPay, allowing access to the nearly 1 billion ATM cardholders from the People's Republic of China. BancNet is allied with global payment brand JCB International. Through this alliance, JCB cardholders can now do cash advances at participating BancNet member ATMs nationwide. Bancnet interconnects with international card networks Diners Club, Discover Card, KFTC, MasterCard, and Visa.

BancNet serves more than 41 million ATM cardholders of its 114 members and affiliates with over 12,000 ATMs and more than 5,000 POS terminals.

In 2008, Expressnet outsourced its ATM operations to BancNet. On January 30, 2015, BancNet and MegaLink announced their merger and will retain itself as its brand.

=== Portugal ===
Multibanco is the single unified interbank network in Portugal, that links the ATMs of all Portuguese banks. This network has existed since 1985 and is owned by SIBS (Sociedade Interbancária de Serviços). Multibanco is a fully integrated interbank network and offers many more services than those usually found in other countries' networks.

Multibanco also has a full-fledged EFTPOS network, the Multibanco Automatic Payment, and is also a provider of mobile phone and Internet banking services through the TeleMultibanco and MBNet services, respectively. It is also the provider of the Via Verde electronic toll collection service.

=== Sri Lanka ===
Launched under the brand name LankaPay in July 2013, the Common Card and Payment Switch (CCAPS) is the first phase of creating a more robust, efficient, and secure payment infrastructure for Sri Lanka. The Central Bank of Sri Lanka has since approved the CCAPS as Sri Lanka's "National Payment Switch".

=== United States ===
Due to the historically fragmented nature of banking in the United States, there have been a large number of small banks, which resulted in a number of different interbank networks being established, mostly along geographic lines. These started to consolidate from the mid 1980s, resulting in three major interbank networks which, by 2003, had over 70% of the volume in the United States:

- STAR
- NYCE
- Pulse

2003 saw the founding of two additional interbank ATM networks:

- Allpoint
- MoneyPass

== See also ==
- ATM usage fees
- ATM controller
