= NYCE =

Interbank Connection Network in the United States and Canada

- Operating area: United States
- Members: 2,358
- ATMs: 301,500
- Founded: 1985
- Owner: FIS
- Website: www.nyce.net

The New York Cash Exchange (NYCE) is an interbank network connecting the ATMs of various financial institutions in the United States and Canada. NYCE also serves as an EFTPOS network for NYCE-linked ATM cards.

NYCE is based in Secaucus, New Jersey. Rivals of the network include STAR and Capital One's Pulse. It is owned by Fidelity National Information Services.

== Origins ==
"NYCE" originally started as a local ATM network of banks located in the New York Metropolitan area, debuting in March 1985 with a network of 800 ATMs at six banks, including Bank of New York, Barclays Bank Chemical Bank, Manufacturers Hanover Trust Company and Marine Midland Bank. It was one of the first networks of its kind, originating shortly after the invention of the ATM (automatic teller machine). Membership was open to all banks, credit unions and savings banks, and as use of ATMs grew, the network spread beyond its original New York Metro area; by the early 1990s, NYCE was the largest regional ATM network in the United States, with a network of 9,600 ATMs in 24 state available to its 17 million customers.

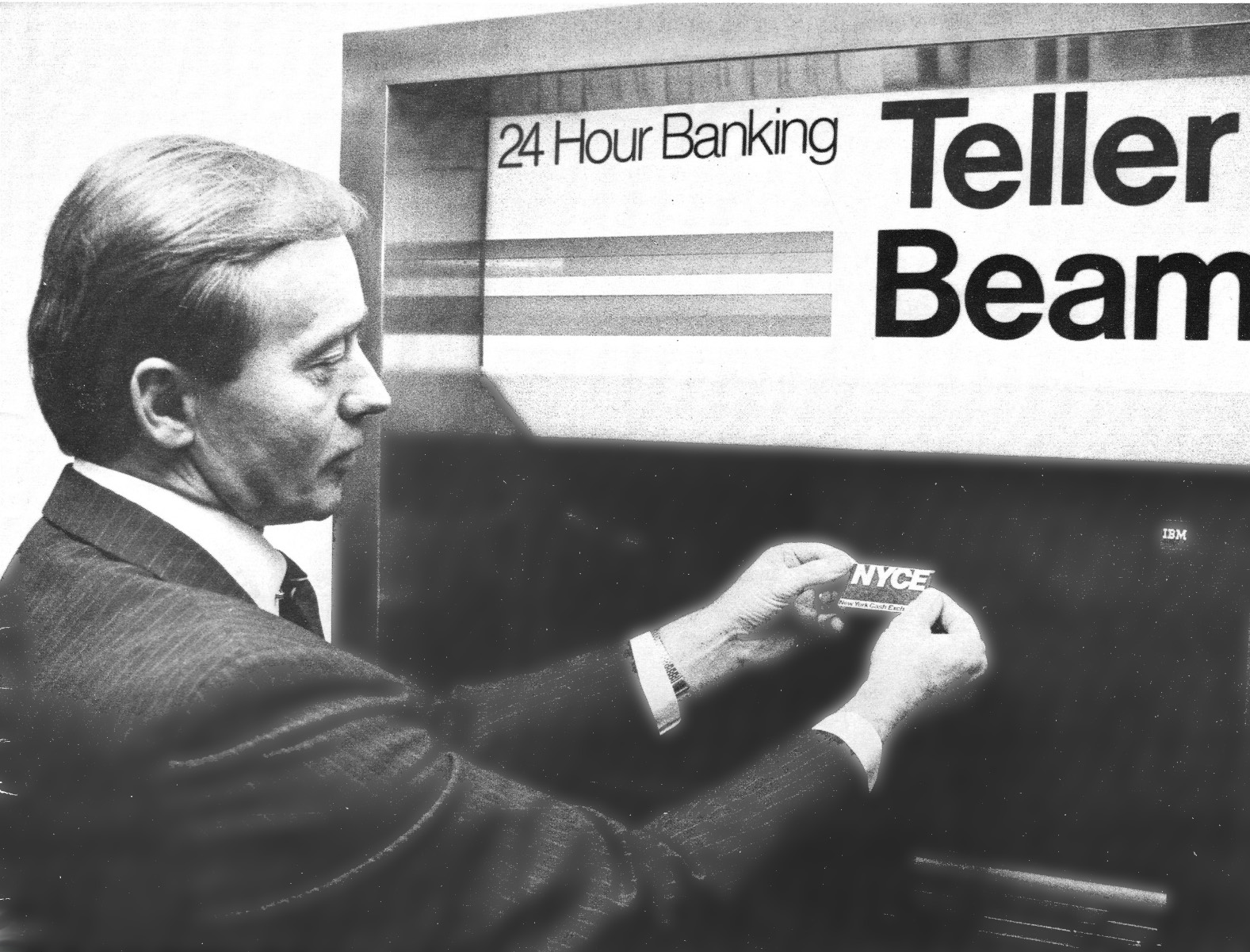
NYCE Chairman Ed Coakley branding the first ATM to go live on the network

The public brand name, "NYCE", is an abbreviation of "New York Cash Exchange"; the original corporate name was the New York Switch Corporation.

The banks which founded and originally owned the network were: National Westminster Bank USA, Chase Manhattan, Manufacturers Hanover, Chemical Bank, Barclays Bank, Marine Midland Bank and the Bank of New York; in later years both BayBank and Fleet Bank from Boston became owners as well. The original Chairman of the Board was Edward Coakley of National Westminster Bank; some of the other members of the Board of Directors were Donald L. Boudreau and Ron Braco of Chase Manhattan, Gary Roboff and Michael Hegarty of Chemical Bank, Stu Segal and Roger Goldman of National Westminster, Robert Muth of Marine Midland, Bob Shay and Lindsey Lawrence of BayBank, and Dennis Lynch of Fleet.

== Current status ==
At present, NYCE is the primary network of 301,500 ATMs with a customer base of 89 million users. NYCE is no longer owned by New York and Boston banks; it was wholly owned by Metavante Corporation, formerly a subsidiary of M&I Bank and based in the Milwaukee suburb of Brown Deer, Wisconsin. On October 1, 2009, Metavante officially became a subsidiary of Fidelity National Information Services.

== See also ==
- ATM usage fees
