= Cirrus (interbank network) =

Worldwide interbank network

- Operating area: Worldwide (except Russia)
- ATMs: 2,000,000+
- Founded: 1982; 44 years ago
- Owner: Mastercard

Cirrus is a worldwide interbank network that provides cash to Mastercard cardholders. As a subsidiary of Mastercard, it connects all Mastercard's credit, debit, and prepaid cards, as well as ATM cards issued by various banks worldwide bearing the Mastercard/Maestro logo.

Founded in 1982, Cirrus System, LLC was originally owned by Bank of Montreal, BayBanks Inc., First Interstate Bancorp, Mellon Bank, NBD Bancorp Inc., and Norwest Corp. Cirrus was acquired by Mastercard in 1987. Before the acquisition, Mastercard had about 9,500 ATMs in 11 countries, which was fewer than Visa; with the acquisition, Mastercard was able to increase their ATMs. By 2002, the Mastercard network of ATMs was almost the equivalent to Visa's in the US and had surpassed Visa globally.

By default, Mastercard and Maestro cards are linked to the Cirrus network, but very often all three logotypes will be shown. Canadian, American and Saudi Arabian ATMs use this network alongside their local networks. Many banks have adopted Cirrus as their international interbank network alongside either a local one, the rival Plus ATM network owned by Visa, or both. In countries such as India and Bangladesh, the Cirrus network also serves as a local interbank network as well as an international one.

== Logo history ==
Logo used from 1982 to 1992

Logo used from 1992 to 1996

Logo used from 1996 to July 14, 2016

The first logo, advertised from 1982 until 1992, was then changed to match those representing the other subsidiaries of Mastercard, which acquired Cirrus in 1987. The only exception is the colour pattern change. This can also be noticed through the re-branding in 2016, since all the logos of Mastercard, Maestro and Cirrus have been equally modified.
