= TVR (disambiguation) =

TVR is a British manufacturer of sports cars.

TVR may also refer to:

== Broadcasting ==
- TvR, Radiotelevisiun Svizra Rumantscha, Romansh television production unit in Switzerland
- TVR (TV network) (Romanian: Televiziunea Română), the public television network of Romania
- Television Rating Point, in audience measurement
- Televisión Registrada, an Argentine TV program
- Televisión Rioja, a regional TV channel in La Rioja, Spain
- Rwanda Television, a Rwandan television channel

== People ==
- T. V. Ramasubbaiyer (1908–1984), Indian businessman
- Trevor van Riemsdyk (born 1991), American ice hockey player

== Transport ==
- Taff Vale Railway, a Welsh rail company (1840–1922)
- Bombardier Guided Light Transit, a French bus technology (French: Transport sur Voie Réservée; 1987–2023)

== Other uses ==
- Terminal verification results, for smart payment cards
- Treasure Valley Rollergirls, a roller derby league in Idaho, US
- Top-view ranchu, a Ranchu goldfish breed standard
