= Vienna International Centre =

Large building complex in Vienna

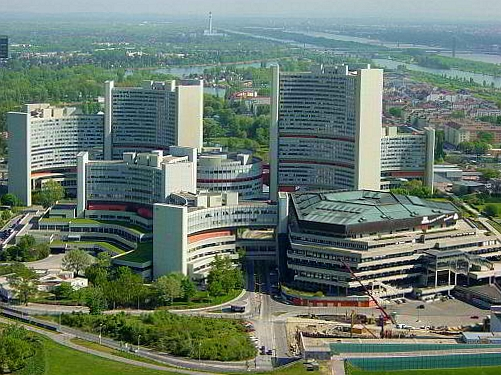
- Interactive map of the Vienna International Centre area

General information
- Type: Office, conference, used by approx. 5001 employees of international organizations
- Location: Donaustadt, Vienna, Austria
- Coordinates: 48°14′05″N 16°25′01″E
- Current tenants: United Nations Office at Vienna
- Construction started: 1973
- Completed: 1979

Height
- Roof: 127 m (417 ft)

Technical details
- Floor count: 28 (building A)
- Floor area: 230,000 m^{2} (2,480,000 sq ft)

Design and construction
- Architect: Johann Staber

Other information
- Public transit: Kaisermühlen

Website
- unvienna.org

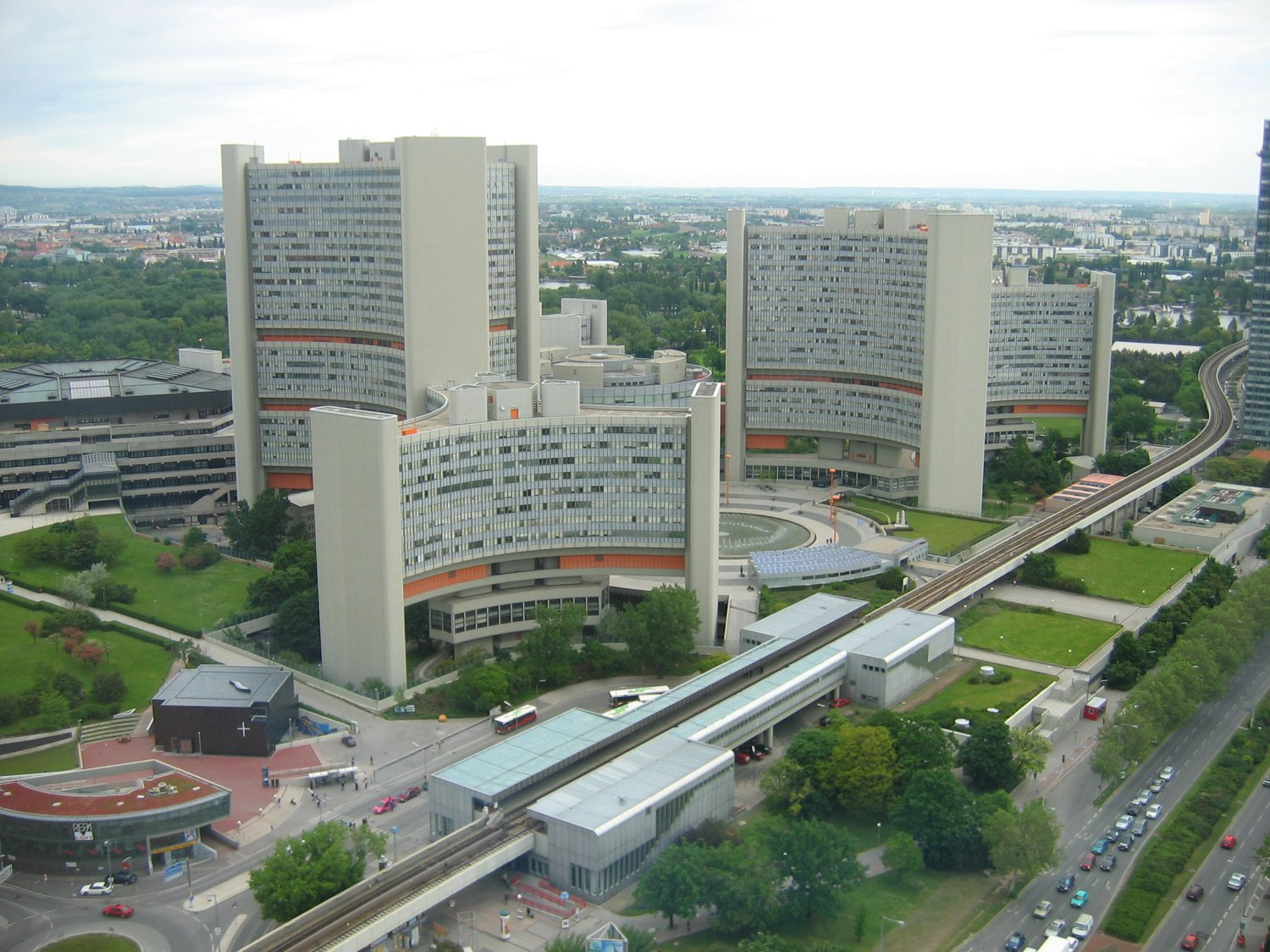
Vienna International Centre (before construction of the M building and the DC Towers). The Austria Center Vienna can be seen at the far left in the middle distance. Kaisermühlen-VIC station can be seen in the foreground.

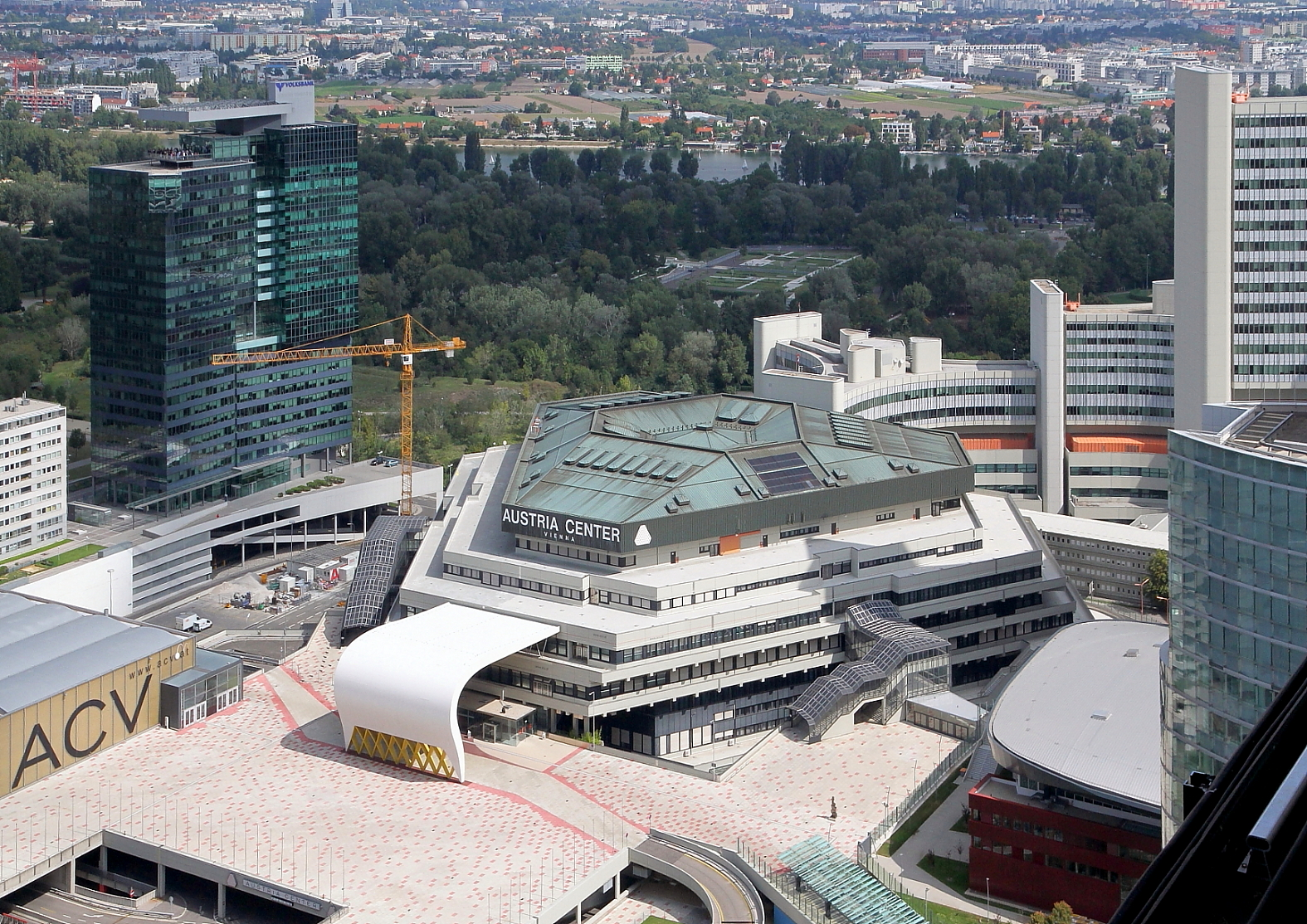
Austria Center Vienna

The Vienna International Centre (VIC) is the campus and building complex hosting the United Nations Office at Vienna (UNOV; in Austrian German: Büro der Vereinten Nationen in Wien). The complex encompassing the Vienna International Centre and the Austria Center Vienna (ACV) convention center is colloquially known as UNO City.

== Overview ==
The VIC, designed by Austrian architect Johann Staber, was built between 1973 and 1979 just north of the river Danube. The initial idea of setting up an international organization in Vienna came from the Chancellor of Austria Dr. Bruno Kreisky.

Six Y-shaped office towers surround a cylindrical conference building for a total floor area of 230,000 square metres. The highest tower ("A Building") stands 127 metres tall, enclosing 28 floors. These office towers were among the first modern skyscrapers to be built in Austria.

About 5,000 people work at the VIC, which also offers catering and shopping facilities and a post office (postal code 1400 Wien). Two banks (Bank Austria, BAWAG P.S.K. and United Nations Federal Credit Union offices), travel agents and other commercial services have offices on the premises.

Complementing the early 2000s asbestos removal works in the VIC, a new conference building, previously designated “C2”, now termed “M Building”, was constructed over the existing parking deck near the southern perimeter of the campus, and put into service in 2009.

The M building hosted all conferences during the renovation of the C building (previously the main conference facility) from 2009 to 2013. Both M and C buildings are now being used for meetings. Very large conferences can be accommodated in the neighbouring Austria Center Vienna (ACV), a separate conference and exhibition centre with a capacity of 6,000, which has an indoor link to the VIC buildings.

The VIC is served by Kaisermühlen-VIC station on line U1 of the Vienna U-Bahn (underground railway). The UN Vienna Visitors Service offers guided tours of the VIC for the general public Monday-Friday.

== Organizations ==
A major UN site along with New York, Geneva and Nairobi, the VIC hosts several organizations:

- Preparatory Commission for the Comprehensive Nuclear-Test-Ban Treaty Organization (CTBTO; German: Organisation des Vertrags über das umfassende Verbot von Nuklearversuchen)
- International Atomic Energy Agency (IAEA; German: Internationale Atomenergieorganisation, IAEO)
- United Nations Commission on International Trade Law (UNCITRAL; German: Kommission der Vereinten Nationen für internationales Handelsrecht)
- United Nations Industrial Development Organization (UNIDO; German: Organisation der Vereinten Nationen für industrielle Entwicklung)
- United Nations Office on Drugs and Crime (UNODC; German: Büro der Vereinten Nationen für Drogen- und Verbrechensbekämpfung)
- United Nations High Commissioner for Refugees (UNHCR; German: Hoher Flüchtlingskommissar der Vereinten Nationen)
- United Nations Office for Outer Space Affairs (UNOOSA; German: Büro der Vereinten Nationen für Weltraumfragen)
- International Commission for the Protection of the Danube River (ICPDR; German: Internationale Kommission zum Schutz der Donau)

The VIC is guarded by United Nations security personnel.

Five other notable international organizations headquartered in Vienna, the Organization for Security and Co-operation in Europe (OSCE), the Organization of Petroleum Exporting Countries (OPEC), the OPEC Fund for International Development (OFID), the International Anti-Corruption Academy (IACA) and the International Institute for Applied Systems Analysis (IIASA), occupy facilities outside the VIC.

== Popular culture ==
The Vienna International Centre has also entered Viennese popular culture through its colloquial name, "UNO City", which is widely used in everyday speech and tourism promotion.

In 2024, a large peace-themed mural by Australian street artist Fintan Magee was completed on one of the VIC buildings as part of a collaboration with Vienna's "Calle Libre" festival and UN organizations.

== See also ==
- Donau City
- List of tallest buildings in Vienna

== Notes ==
1. The official name uses British spelling (Centre), following UN conventions. In contrast to the VIC, the ACV officially uses American spelling (Center).
