= MPI =

MPI or Mpi may refer to:

== Science and technology ==
=== Biology and medicine ===
- Magnetic particle imaging, a tomographic technique
- Myocardial perfusion imaging, a medical procedure that illustrates heart function
- Mannose phosphate isomerase, an enzyme
- Mass psychogenic illness, the rapid spread of illness symptoms where there is no infectious agent
- Master patient index, an index referencing all patients
- Multidimensional Pain Inventory, a pain medicine assessment questionnaire

=== Computing ===
- Marburg Picture Index, online database of photographs of artworks
- Merchant plug-in, software used to prevent credit card fraud on e-commerce sites
- Message Parsing Interpreter, a Lisp-like language on TinyMUCK
- Message Passing Interface, a communications protocol for parallel computation
- Multi-Point Interface, an automation programming protocol from Siemens
- Multipath interference, a physical effect that causes signal degradation in communication systems
- Multiple precision integer, a programming language type supporting arbitrary precision

=== Other science and technology ===
- Magnetic particle inspection, a method of detecting defects in ferrous materials
- Multi point injection, fuel injection system for automobile engines
- Maximum potential intensity, a meteorology term associated with tropical cyclones

== Companies and organizations ==
- Magnetic Peripherals Inc., a Control Data Corporation subsidiary renamed Imprimis and sold to Seagate Technology
- Manitoba Public Insurance, a Crown corporation in Manitoba
- Materials Processing Institute, a company providing industrial R&D services based in the UK
- Max Planck Institute, Germany
- Metro Pacific Investments Corporation (MPIC), a Filipino investment holding company
- Migration Policy Institute, Washington, DC
- Mihajlo Pupin Institute, Serbia
- Ministry for Primary Industries, New Zealand
- Ministry of Planning and Investment, Vietnam
- Mission Pictures International, a foreign sales, finance, and distribution company
- MotivePower, a locomotive manufacturer and rebuilder
- Moving Picture Institute, an American non-profit organization and film production company
- MPI Media Group, an American home entertainment company

== Other uses ==
- Mpi language, a language of Thailand
- Mpi people, an ethnic group from Thailand
- Mariposa-Yosemite Airport (FAA location identifier), California, US
- Milanka Price Index, a stock index in Sri Lanka
- Multidimensional Poverty Index, used by the UNDP
