= Strong customer authentication =

Requirement for payment service providers in the EU

Strong customer authentication (SCA) is a requirement of the EU Revised Directive on Payment Services (PSD2) on payment service providers within the European Economic Area. The requirement ensures that electronic payments are performed with multi-factor authentication, to increase the security of electronic payments. Physical card transactions already commonly have what could be termed strong customer authentication in the EU (Chip and PIN), but this has not generally been true for Internet transactions across the EU prior to the implementation of the requirement, and many contactless card payments do not use a second authentication factor.

The SCA requirement came into force on 14 September 2019. However, with the approval of the European Banking Authority, several EEA countries have announced that their implementation will be temporarily delayed or phased, with a final deadline set for 31 December 2020.

== Requirement ==
Article 97(1) of the directive requires that payment service providers use strong customer authentication where a payer:

(a) accesses its payment account online;
(b) initiates an electronic payment transaction;
(c) carries out any action through a remote channel which may imply a risk of payment fraud or other abuses.

Article 4(30) defines "strong customer authentication" itself (as multi-factor authentication):

an authentication based on the use of two or more elements categorised as knowledge (something only the user knows), possession (something only the user possesses) and inherence (something the user is) that are independent, in that the breach of one does not compromise the reliability of the others, and is designed in such a way as to protect the confidentiality of the authentication data

== Implementation ==
The European Banking Authority published an opinion on what approaches could constitute different "elements" of SCA.

3-D Secure 2.0 can (but does not always) meet the requirements of SCA. 3-D Secure has implementations by Mastercard (Mastercard Identity Check) and Visa which are marketed as enabling SCA compliance.

E-commerce merchants must update the payment flows in their websites and apps to support authentication. If authentication is not supported, many payments will be declined once SCA is fully implemented.

== History ==
On 31 January 2013, the European Central Bank (ECB) issued recommendations on Internet payment security, requiring strong customer authentication. The ECB's requirements are technologically neutral, in order to foster innovation and competition. The public submission process to the ECB identified three solutions to strong customer authentication, two of which are based on reliance authentication, and the other being the new variant of 3-D Secure which incorporates one-time passwords.

Subsequently, the European Commission drafted proposals for an updated Payment Services Directive including this requirement, which became PSD2. PSD2 strong customer authentication has been a legal requirement for electronic payments and credit cards since 14 September 2019.

== Criticism ==
In 2016, Visa criticised the proposal of making strong customer authentication mandatory, on the grounds that it could make online payments more difficult, and thus hurt sales at online retailers.

In 2019, consumer representation group Which? noted that many UK banks were implementing SCA by requiring a phone capable of receiving a text message or push notification. When surveyed, nearly one in five Which? members were concerned that they may be unable to make payments if there was no alternative, either due to poor reception or not owning a phone.

In 2020, an independent report conducted by consultancy firm CMSPI found that the potential disruption caused by strong customer authentication (excluding the United Kingdom) could be €108 billion in 2021.

== Outside Europe ==
The Reserve Bank of India has mandated an "additional factor of authentication" for card-not-present transactions.

A proposal to make 3-D Secure mandatory in Australia was blocked by the Australian Competition & Consumer Commission in 2016 after objections.

== See also ==
- 3D Secure
