= Markus Kuhn (computer scientist) =

German computer scientist

- Born: Markus Guenther Kuhn; 1971 (age 54–55); Munich, West Germany
- Education: University of Erlangen-Nuremberg; Purdue University; Wolfson College, Cambridge
- Known for: EURion constellation
- Scientific career
- Fields: Computer science Computer security Tamper resistance
- Workplaces: University of Cambridge; Purdue University; University of Erlangen-Nuremberg
- Thesis: Compromising emanations: eavesdropping risks of computer displays (2002)
- Doctoral advisor: Ross J. Anderson
- Doctoral students: Steven Murdoch
- Website: www.cl.cam.ac.uk/~mgk25/

Markus Guenther Kuhn (born 1971) is a German computer scientist, currently working at the Computer Laboratory, University of Cambridge and a fellow of Wolfson College, Cambridge.

== Education ==
Kuhn was educated at University of Erlangen (Germany), he received his Master of Science degree at Purdue University and PhD at the University of Cambridge.

== Research ==
Kuhn's main research interests include computer security, in particular the hardware and signal-processing aspects of it, and distributed systems. He is known, among other things, for his work on security microcontrollers, compromising emanations, and distance-bounding protocols. He developed the Stirmark test for digital watermarking schemes, the OTPW one-time password system, and headed the project that extended the X11 misc-fixed fonts to Unicode.

In 1994, as an undergraduate student, he became known for developing several ways to circumvent the VideoCrypt encryption system, most notably the Season7 smartcard emulator.

In 2002, he published a new method for eavesdropping CRT screens and in 2003 he went on to publish mitigations such as "Tempest fonts".

In 2010, Kuhn was asked to analyse the ADE 651, a device used in Iraq that was said to be a bomb-detecting device; he found that it contained nothing but an anti-theft tag and said that it was "impossible" that the device could detect anything whatsoever.

He is also known for some of his work on international standardisation, such as pioneering the introduction of Unicode/UTF-8 under Linux.

== Awards and honours ==
In 1987 and 1988, he won the German national computer-science contest, and in 1989, he won a gold medal for the West German team at the International Olympiad in Informatics.
