= Carte Bleue =

Former debit card payment system in France

- Location: France
- Launched: 1967
- Discontinued: 2010
- Website: carte-bleue.com at the Wayback Machine (archived 2005-11-04)

Carte Bleue (English: Blue Card) was a major debit card payment system operating in France. Unlike Visa Electron or Maestro debit cards, Carte Bleue transactions worked without requiring authorization from the cardholder's bank. In many situations, the card worked like a credit card but without fees for the cardholder. The system has now been integrated into a wider scheme called CB or carte bancaire ("banking card"). All Carte Bleue cards were part of CB, but not all CB cards were Carte Bleue.

The system was national, and pure Carte Bleue cards did not operate outside France. However, it is possible and commonplace to get a CB Visa card that operates outside France. Carte Bleue was, technically speaking, the local Visa affiliate.

Carte Bleue started in 1967, associating six French banks: BNP, CCF, Crédit du Nord, CIC, Crédit Lyonnais, and Société Générale. Combined Visa cards have existed since 1973 under the name Carte Bleue Internationale, changing to Carte Bleue Visa in 1976.

From 1992 on, all Cartes Bleues / CB have been smart cards. When using a Carte Bleue at a French merchant, the PIN of the card must be used, and a microchip on the card verifies and authenticates the transaction. Only some very limited transactions, such as motorway tolls or parking fees, are paid without PIN. Since automatic teller machines also check for the PIN, this measure strongly reduces the incentive to steal Cartes Bleues, since the cards are essentially useless without the PIN (though one may try using the card number for mail-order or e-retailing). Foreign cards without microchips can still be used at French merchants if they accept them, with the usual procedure of swiping the magnetic stripe and signing the receipt.

In 2000, Serge Humpich, after failing to convince the makers of a serious flaw he had found two years before, purchased some metro tickets to prove it. He sent the proof to Groupement des Cartes Bancaires. They then initiated criminal action against him, and he was convicted and sentenced to a ten months suspended jail sentence.

In 2003, the Cartes Bleues / CB started to move on to the international standard EMV for smart chips, allowing for their use abroad.

In 2010, the Carte Bleue brand was phased out in favour of Visa; however, the term carte bleue continues to be used as a generic term for EFT-based payment cards, including debit and credit cards.

== See also ==
- Groupement des Cartes Bancaires CB
- ATM usage fees
