= Fixed (typeface) =

- Category: Monospace sans-serif
- Designer(s): Unknown
- Shown here: 5x7, 7x13, 10x20

misc-fixed is a collection of monospace bitmap fonts that is distributed with the X Window System. It is a set of independent bitmap fonts which—apart from all being sans-serif fonts—cannot be described as belonging to a single font family. The misc-fixed fonts were the first fonts available for the X Window System. Their individual origin is not attributed, but it is likely that many of them were created in the early or mid 1980s as part of MIT's Project Athena, or at its industrial partner, DEC. The misc-fixed fonts are in the public domain.

The individual fonts in the collection have a short name that matches their respective pixel dimensions, plus a letter that indicates a bold or oblique variant. They can also be accessed using their (much longer) X Logical Font Description string:

5x7	-Misc-Fixed-Medium-R-Normal--7-70-75-75-C-50-ISO10646-1
5x8	-Misc-Fixed-Medium-R-Normal--8-80-75-75-C-50-ISO10646-1
6x9	-Misc-Fixed-Medium-R-Normal--9-90-75-75-C-60-ISO10646-1
6x10	-Misc-Fixed-Medium-R-Normal--10-100-75-75-C-60-ISO10646-1
6x12	-Misc-Fixed-Medium-R-Semicondensed--12-110-75-75-C-60-ISO10646-1
6x13	-Misc-Fixed-Medium-R-SemiCondensed--13-120-75-75-C-60-ISO10646-1
6x13B	-Misc-Fixed-Bold-R-SemiCondensed--13-120-75-75-C-60-ISO10646-1
6x13O	-Misc-Fixed-Medium-O-SemiCondensed--13-120-75-75-C-60-ISO10646-1
7x13	-Misc-Fixed-Medium-R-Normal--13-120-75-75-C-70-ISO10646-1
7x13B	-Misc-Fixed-Bold-R-Normal--13-120-75-75-C-70-ISO10646-1
7x13O	-Misc-Fixed-Medium-O-Normal--13-120-75-75-C-70-ISO10646-1
7x14	-Misc-Fixed-Medium-R-Normal--14-130-75-75-C-70-ISO10646-1
7x14B	-Misc-Fixed-Bold-R-Normal--14-130-75-75-C-70-ISO10646-1
8x13	-Misc-Fixed-Medium-R-Normal--13-120-75-75-C-80-ISO10646-1
8x13B	-Misc-Fixed-Bold-R-Normal--13-120-75-75-C-80-ISO10646-1
8x13O	-Misc-Fixed-Medium-O-Normal--13-120-75-75-C-80-ISO10646-1
9x15	-Misc-Fixed-Medium-R-Normal--15-140-75-75-C-90-ISO10646-1
9x15B	-Misc-Fixed-Bold-R-Normal--15-140-75-75-C-90-ISO10646-1
9x18	-Misc-Fixed-Medium-R-Normal--18-120-100-100-C-90-ISO10646-1
9x18B	-Misc-Fixed-Bold-R-Normal--18-120-100-100-C-90-ISO10646-1
10x20	-Misc-Fixed-Medium-R-Normal--20-200-75-75-C-100-ISO10646-1
12x13ja	-Misc-Fixed-Medium-R-Normal-ja-13-120-75-75-C-120-ISO10646-1
18x18ja	-Misc-Fixed-Medium-R-Normal-ja-18-120-100-100-C-180-ISO10646-1
18x18ko	-Misc-Fixed-Medium-R-Normal-ko-18-120-100-100-C-180-ISO10646-1

The "6x13" font is usually also available under the alias "fixed", a font name that is expected to be available on every X server.

The fonts originally covered only the ASCII repertoire, and were in the early 1990s extended to cover all characters in ISO 8859-1. In 1997, Markus Kuhn initiated and headed a project to extend the misc-fixed fonts to as large a subset of Unicode/ISO 10646 as is feasible for each of the available font sizes. This project's goal was to get Linux developers interested in abandoning the 1990s dominant ISO 8859-1 encoding, in favour of using UTF-8 instead, which happened indeed within a few years. Thanks to this effort, all the misc fixed fonts now cover the characters found in

- ISO 8859 parts 1-5, 7-10, 13-15 (i.e., all parts except Arabic and Thai)
- ISO 6937 and the CEN MES-1 European Unicode Subset
- IBM/Microsoft code pages CP 437, 850, 1251, 1252, and many others
- Microsoft/Adobe Systems Windows Glyph List 4 (WGL4)
- KOI8-R
- DEC VT100 graphics symbols

The 6x13, 8x13, 9x15, 9x18, and 10x20 fonts cover a much larger repertoire, that covers in addition the comprehensive CEN MES-3A European Unicode 3.2 subset, the International Phonetic Alphabet, Armenian, Georgian, Thai, Yiddish, all Latin, Greek, and Cyrillic characters, all mathematical symbols (including the entire TeX repertoire), APL, Braille, Runes, and much more. 9x15 and 10x20 also cover Ethiopic.

The misc-fixed fonts have been much less commonly used since support for scalable outline font formats such as Type 1, TrueType and OpenType has become available for X. However, they are still commonly used with terminal emulators, such as xterm, and as a fallback font for the many Unicode characters not yet found in common outline fonts.

The fonts are distributed in the BDF format and are currently maintained by Markus Kuhn.
