= Steven Murdoch =

British computer security expert

Steven Murdoch FBCS FIET
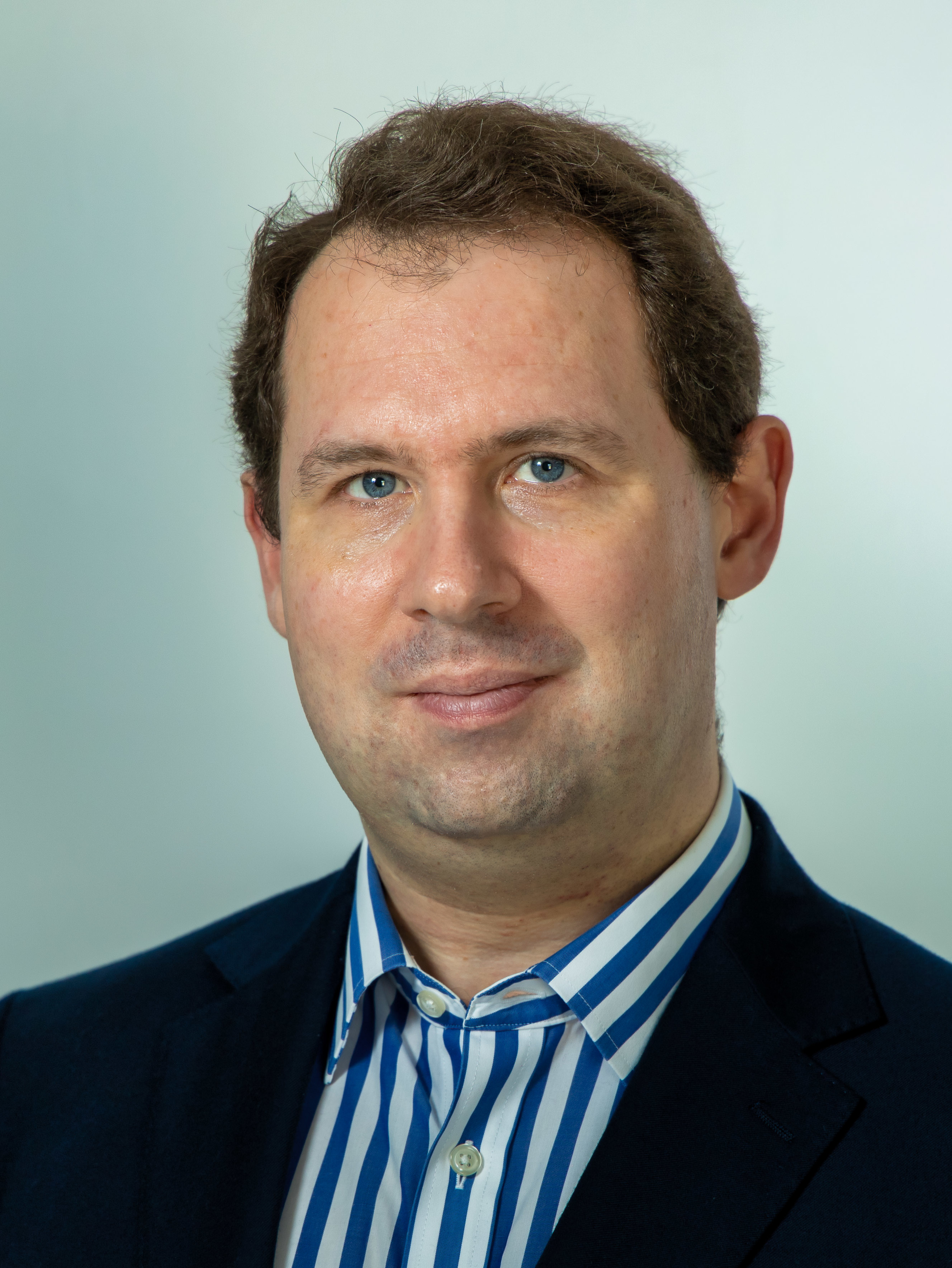
- Born: Steven James Murdoch
- Education: University of Cambridge
- Known for: Tor project EMV/Chip and PIN
- Scientific career
- Fields: Security; Privacy; Anonymous communication Chip and PIN; Europay, Master and Visa (EMV)
- Workplaces: Computer Science Department, University College London
- Thesis: Covert channel vulnerabilities in anonymity systems (2008)
- Doctoral advisor: Markus Kuhn
- Website: murdoch.is

Steven James Murdoch is Professor of Security Engineering in the Computer Science Department, University College London. His research covers privacy-enhancing technology, Internet censorship, and anonymous communication, in particular Tor. He is also known for discovering several vulnerabilities in the EMV bank chipcard payment system (Chip and PIN) and for creating Tor Browser.

== Education and career ==
Murdoch was educated at the University of Cambridge completing a PhD on computer security supervised by Markus Kuhn in 2008. In March 2022, he joined the board of Open Rights Group.

== Awards and honours ==
He is a Fellow of the British Computer Society and Fellow of the Institution of Engineering and Technology. He received the 2008 ERCIM Security and Trust Management Working Group Award for his PhD thesis "Covert channel vulnerabilities in anonymity systems". In 2012 he was appointed as a Royal Society University Research Fellow.
