= Terminal verification results =

Terminal verification results (TVR) or Tag '95' is an EMV data object . The TVR is a series of bits set by the terminal reading an EMV card, based on logical tests (for example has the card expired). This data object is used in the terminal's decision whether to accept, decline or go on-line for a payment transaction. The format of the TVR is as follows:

Byte 1
b8	b7	b6	b5	b4	b3	b2	b1	Meaning
1								Offline data authentication was not performed
	1							SDA failed
		1						ICC data missing
			1					Card number appears on hotlist
				1				DDA failed
					1			CDA failed
						1		SDA was selected
							0	RFU

Byte 2
b8	b7	b6	b5	b4	b3	b2	b1	Meaning
1								Card and terminal have different application versions
	1							Expired application
		1						Application not yet effective
			1					Requested service not allowed for card product
				1				New card
					0			RFU
						0		RFU
							0	RFU

Byte 3
b8	b7	b6	b5	b4	b3	b2	b1	Meaning
1								Cardholder verification was not successful
	1							Unrecognised CVM
		1						PIN try limit exceeded
			1					PIN entry required, but no PIN pad present or not working
				1				PIN entry required, PIN pad present, but PIN was not entered
					1			On-line PIN entered
						0		RFU
							0	RFU

Byte 4
b8	b7	b6	b5	b4	b3	b2	b1	Meaning
1								Transaction exceeds floor limit
	1							Lower consecutive offline limit exceeded
		1						Upper consecutive offline limit exceeded
			1					Transaction selected randomly of on-line processing
				1				Merchant forced transaction on-line
					0			RFU
						0		RFU
							0	RFU

Byte 5
b8	b7	b6	b5	b4	b3	b2	b1	Meaning
1								Default TDOL Used
	1							Issuer authentication failed
		1						Script processing failed before final Generate AC
			1					Script processing failed after final Generate AC
				1				Relay resistance threshold exceeded (Contactless Kernel 2)
					1			Relay resistance time limits exceeded (Contactless Kernel 2)
						0	0	Relay resistance protocol not supported (Contactless Kernel 2)
						0	1	Relay resistance protocol not performed (Contactless Kernel 2)
						1	0	Relay resistance protocol performed (Contactless Kernel 2)
						1	1	RFU

== See also ==
- EMV
