= United Nations Federal Credit Union =

Credit union

- Company type: Credit union
- Industry: Financial services
- Founded: 1947
- Headquarters: Long Island City, New York, United States
- Key people: John Lewis, President/CEO; Pamela K. Agnone, Executive Vice President
- Website: unfcu.org

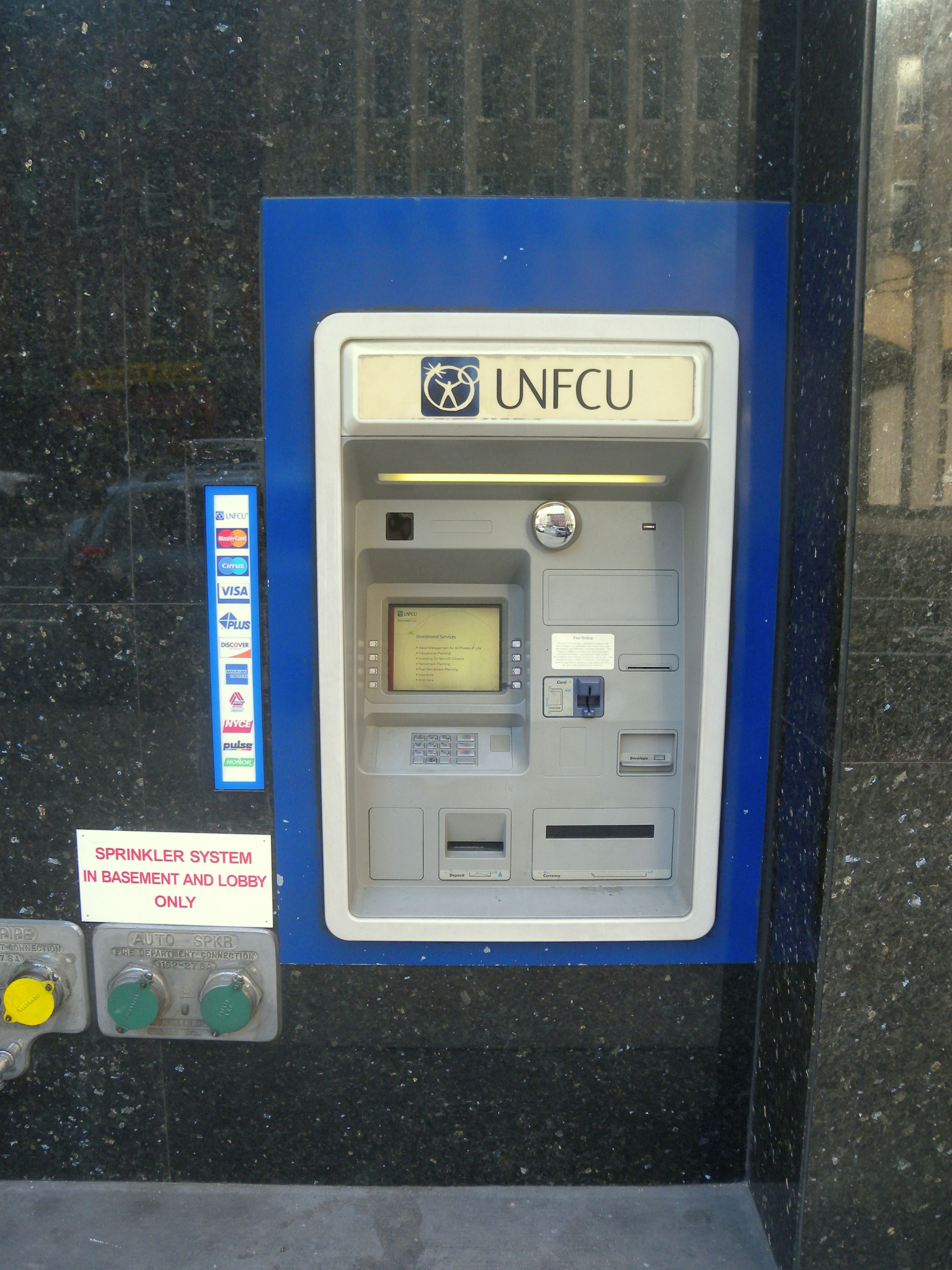
ATM for UNFCU

The United Nations Federal Credit Union is an American credit union, with its head offices in Long Island City, in New York State. It was founded in 1947 by United Nations employees.

In October 2010 UNFCU began issuing chip-and-PIN cards to its customers, the first institution in the United States to do so. UNFCU membership is open to employees, consultants and retirees of the United Nations and affiliated agencies, including the World Bank and the International Monetary Fund, as well as their family members. It is also open to United Nations volunteers and those affiliated with the United Nations International School.
