= CB Bank Card Group =

French national interbank network

Groupement des cartes bancaires CB
- Operating area: France
- Members: 128
- ATMs: 46,150
- Founded: 1984; 42 years ago
- Owner: Orange S.A. (4,45%); Banque de France (3,33%)
- Website: www.cartes-bancaires.com

The CB Bank Card Group (French: Groupement des cartes bancaires CB), also known as simply CB, is France's national interbank network jointly owned by Orange Group, Banque de France and member banks, with over 46,000 ATMs and over 1 million EFTPOS acceptance points.

Carte Bleue Visa is a brand often associated with CB. In fact, all Carte Bleue cards are part of CB but not all CB cards are Carte Bleue (they could also be Mastercard). CB offers the ATM and EFTPOS networking infrastructure, while Carte Bleue is the debit card or mode of payment.

CB GIE was created in 1984 by the six founding banks of Carte Bleue, plus Crédit Agricole and Crédit Mutuel. Since 1992, all CB cards are smart cards; France was the first country to bring into the mainstream the use of smart cards with PIN verification in lieu of magnetic stripe cards and signature verification.

In an example of a genericized trademark, it is commonplace in France to refer to any payment card as a carte bleue, whether or not this is in fact the case.

Carte Bleue Group logo since 1967
CB logo from 1984 to 2015

== See also ==
- Carte Bleue
