= EBIC =

EBIC may refer to:

- Electron beam-induced current, a semiconductor analysis technique
- Electronic Banking Internet Communication Standard, a transmission protocol for banking information
- The electron Bio-Imaging Centre (eBIC), a UK national facility for structural biology using Cryogenic electron microscopy
