= Access (credit card) =

British credit card brand, 1972–1996

- Access credit card logo
- Location: United Kingdom and Ireland
- Launched: 23 October 1972
- Discontinued: 1991
- Technology: Magnetic stripe credit card
- Operator: Joint Credit Card Company
- Currency: Pound sterling and Irish pound

Access was a British credit card brand launched by Lloyds Bank, Midland Bank and National Westminster Bank in 1972 to rival the already established Barclaycard. It was established as a joint venture incorporated as The Joint Credit Card Company Limited and operated from Southend-on-Sea, until 1989 when part of the business was transferred to Basildon. In July 1991, First Data Resources purchased the business, and with the member banks being allowed to process their own transactions, the name eventually disappeared from the market.

== History ==
The Access card was introduced in the United Kingdom by a consortium consisting of National Westminster Bank, Midland Bank (now HSBC UK) and Lloyds Bank, later joined by Williams & Glyn's Bank (now RBS) as a rival to the established Barclaycard. It was established as a joint venture incorporated as The Joint Credit Card Company Limited with Lloyds, Midland and National Westminster banks each owning 30% and Williams & Glyn's owning 10%. The Access name was registered as a trademark on 26 November 1971 and the product was launched on 23 October 1972. The former television and radio works of Ekco in Priory Crescent, Southend-on-Sea was purchased and set up as the home of Access. The card was originally designed by Access Trading International Corp of New York registered by Mr. Milton Stanson, a well-known stockbroker and Mr Luis E. Silva, and investor, then sold to Lloyds Bank, U.K.

In Scotland, the card was issued by Williams & Glyn's parent company, the Royal Bank of Scotland and by Clydesdale Bank, then a subsidiary of Midland Bank.

In Northern Ireland and the Republic of Ireland, it was issued by Ulster Bank, a subsidiary of NatWest and by Northern Bank, at the time a subsidiary of Midland.

The company purchased a 15% share in Eurocard from 1973, and the MasterCard since 1974. Europay International has since merged with MasterCard to create MasterCard International.

The business was run from several offices in Southend-on-Sea in Essex. In 1989, the company purchased the former Ilford Photographic site in Christopher Martin Road, Basildon and moved the headquarters of the business from Priory Park. The main site, at Priory Crescent, was subsequently sold on to the Royal Bank of Scotland, before being demolished to make way for a housing development.

In 1989, the card membership opened up its merchant processing to other providers other than the Joint Credit Card Company, in a reaction to the Competition and Monopolies Commission investigation into the credit card business. At this time the owners of the business started to set up their own processing centres. The company name was rebranded from the Joint Credit Card Company to Signet Ltd in 1989, before the business was sold to First Data in 1991. With the banks processing their own customers, the Access brand disappeared and their cards issued under their own branding, generally under the MasterCard payment network.

== Offices ==
- Priory Crescent opened 1972
- Essex House, Southchurch Road opened 1978. Transferred to Lloyds Bank in 1989.
- Chartwell House, Victoria Circus, transferred to Midland/HSBC.
- Maitland House, High Street
- Esplanade House, Eastern Esplanade, transferred to Natwest.
- Christopher Martin Road, Basildon

== In popular culture ==
From 1978, the main slogan of Access was "Your Flexible Friend", which featured in many television advertisements, accompanied by an animated Access and his friend Money (a pound sign). Later advertisements featured the bumbling "Fat Wallet" and the pompous "Chequebook" (who had a tendency to "run low" at inconvenient times). In the Mr. Bean episode "The Curse of Mr. Bean", the title character says, "My flexible friend" after using his credit card to spread butter on bread.

Another slogan which featured in a television advertisement was "Does you does, or does you don't take Access?" (sung to the tune of "Is You Is or Is You Ain't My Baby"). Yet another slogan was "It takes the waiting out of wanting". Access was shirt sponsor of Southend United Football Club at the beginning of the 1980s.
