= International Bank Account Number =

Alphanumeric code that uniquely identifies a bank account in any participating country

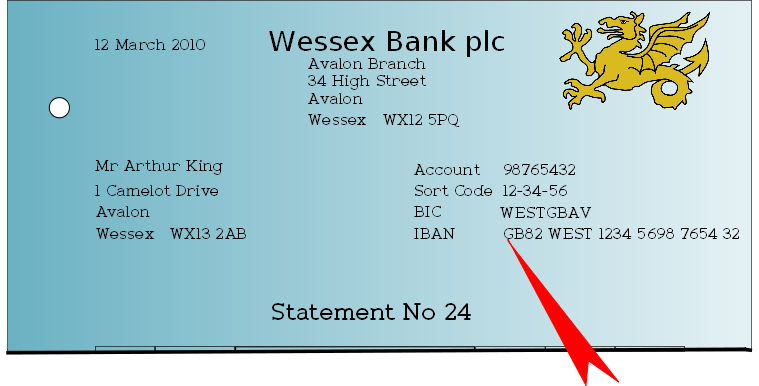
A typical British bank statement header (from a fictitious bank), showing the location of the account's IBAN

The International Bank Account Number (IBAN) is an internationally agreed upon system of identifying bank accounts across national borders to facilitate the communication and processing of cross border transactions with a reduced risk of transcription errors. An IBAN uniquely identifies the account of a customer at a financial institution. It was originally adopted by the European Committee for Banking Standards (ECBS) and since 1997 as the international standard ISO 13616 under the International Organization for Standardization (ISO). The current version is ISO 13616:2020, which indicates the Society for Worldwide Interbank Financial Telecommunication (SWIFT) as the formal registrar. Initially developed to facilitate payments within the European Union, it has been implemented by most European countries and numerous countries in other parts of the world, mainly in the Middle East and the Caribbean. By December 2024, 89 countries were using the IBAN numbering system.

The IBAN consists of up to 34 alphanumeric characters comprising a country code; two check digits; and a number that includes the domestic bank account number, branch identifier, and potential routing information. The check digits enable a check of the bank account number to confirm its integrity before submitting a transaction.

== Background ==
Before IBAN, differing national standards for bank account identification (i.e. bank, branch, routing codes, and account number) were confusing for some users. This often led to necessary routing information being missing from payments. Routing information as specified by ISO 9362 (also known as Business Identifier Codes (BIC), SWIFT ID or SWIFT code, and SWIFT-BIC) does not require a specific format for the transaction so the identification of accounts and transaction types is left to agreements of the transaction partners. It also does not contain check digits, so errors of transcription were not detectable and it was not possible for a sending bank to validate the routing information prior to submitting the payment. Routing errors caused delayed payments and incurred extra costs to the sending and receiving banks and often to intermediate routing banks.

In 1997, to overcome these difficulties, the International Organization for Standardization (ISO) published ISO 13616:1997. This proposal had a degree of flexibility that the European Committee for Banking Standards (ECBS) believed would make it unworkable, and they produced a "slimmed down" version of the standard which, amongst other things, permitted only upper-case letters and required that the IBAN for each country have a fixed length. ISO 13616:1997 was subsequently withdrawn and replaced by ISO 13616:2003. The standard was revised again in 2007 when it was split into two parts. ISO 13616-1:2007 "specifies the elements of an international bank account number (IBAN) used to facilitate the processing of data internationally in data interchange, in financial environments as well as within and between other industries" but "does not specify internal procedures, file organization techniques, storage media, languages, etc. to be used in its implementation". ISO 13616-2:2007 describes "the Registration Authority (RA) responsible for the registry of IBAN formats that are compliant with ISO 13616-1 [and] the procedures for registering ISO 13616-compliant IBAN formats". The official IBAN registrar under ISO 13616-2:2007 is SWIFT.

IBAN imposes a flexible but regular format sufficient for account identification and contains validation information to avoid errors in transcription. It carries all the routing information needed to get a payment from one bank to another wherever it may be; it contains key bank account details such as country code, branch codes (known as sort codes in the UK and Ireland) and account numbers, and it contains check digits which can be validated at the source according to a single standard procedure.

== Structure ==
The IBAN consists of up to 34 alphanumeric characters, as follows:

- country code using ISO 3166-1 alpha-2 – two letters,
- check digits – two digits, and
- Basic Bank Account Number (BBAN) – up to 30 alphanumeric characters that are country-specific.

The check digits represent the checksum of the bank account number which is used by banking systems to confirm that the number contains no simple errors.

In order to facilitate reading by humans, IBANs are traditionally expressed in groups of four characters separated by spaces, the last group being of variable length as shown in the example below; when transmitted electronically however spaces are omitted. Current exceptions to this formatting are Burundi (4, 5, 5, 11, 2), Egypt (no spaces), Libya (4, 3, 3, 15), and El Salvador (2, 2, 4, 20).

Irish IBAN
Human readable	IE64 IRCE 9205 0112 3456 78
Machine readable	IE64IRCE92050112345678

Burundi IBAN
Human readable	BI13 20001 10001 00001234567 89
Machine readable	BI1320001100010000123456789

Permitted IBAN characters are the digits 0 to 9 and the 26 Latin alphabetic characters A to Z. This applies even in countries where these characters are not used in the national language (e.g. Greece).

=== Basic Bank Account Number ===
The Basic Bank Account Number (BBAN) format is decided by the national central bank or designated payment authority of each country. There is no consistency between the formats adopted. The national authority may register its BBAN format with SWIFT but is not obliged to do so. It may adopt IBAN without registration. SWIFT also acts as the registration authority for the SWIFT system, which is used by most countries that have not adopted IBAN. A major difference between the two systems is that under SWIFT there is no requirement that BBANs used within a country be of a pre-defined length.

The BBAN must be of a fixed length for the country and comprise case-insensitive alphanumeric characters. It includes the domestic bank account number, branch identifier, and potential routing information. Each country can have a different national routing/account numbering system, up to a maximum of 30 alphanumeric characters.

=== Check digits ===
The check digits enable the sending bank (or its customer) to perform a sanity check of the routing destination and account number from a single string of data at the time of data entry. This check is guaranteed to detect any instances where a single character has been omitted, duplicated, mistyped or where two characters have been transposed.

== Processing ==
One of the design aims of the IBAN was to enable as much validation as possible to be done at the point of data entry. In particular, the computer program that accepts an IBAN will be able to validate:

- Country code
- Number of characters in the IBAN correspond to the number specified for the country code
- BBAN format specified for the country code
- Account number, bank code and country code combination is compatible with the check digits

The check digits are calculated using MOD-97-10 as per ISO/IEC 7064:2003 (abbreviated to mod-97 in this article), which specifies a set of check character systems capable of protecting strings against errors which occur when people copy or key data. In particular, the standard states that the following can be detected:

- All single substitution errors (the substitution of a single character for another, for example 4234 for 1234)
- All or nearly all single (local) transposition errors (the transposition of two single characters, either adjacent or with one character between them, for example 12354 or 12543 for 12345)
- All or nearly all shift errors (shifts of the whole string to the left or right)
- High proportion of double substitution errors (two separate single substitution errors in the same string, for example 7234587 for 1234567)
- High proportion of all other errors

The underlying rules for IBANs is that the account-servicing financial institution should issue an IBAN, as there are a number of areas where different IBANs could be generated from the same account and branch numbers that would satisfy the generic IBAN validation rules. In particular cases where 00 is a valid check digit, 97 will not be a valid check digit, likewise, if 01 is a valid check digit, 98 will not be a valid check digit, similarly with 02 and 99.

The UN CEFACT TBG5 has published a free IBAN validation service in 32 languages for all 57 countries that have adopted the IBAN standard. They have also published the JavaScript source code of the verification algorithm.

An English language IBAN checker for ECBS member country bank accounts is available on its website.

=== Algorithms ===
==== Validating the IBAN ====
An IBAN is validated by converting it into an integer and performing a basic mod-97 operation (as described in ISO 7064) on it. If the IBAN is valid, the remainder equals 1. (Note: In equations, the remainder of A divided by B is denoted A mod B or A (mod B), e.g., 2 = 14 mod 12 . See Remainders.) The algorithm of IBAN validation is as follows:

1. Check that the total IBAN length is correct as per the country. If not, the IBAN is invalid
2. Move the four initial characters to the end of the string
3. Replace each letter in the string with two digits, thereby expanding the string, where A = 10, B = 11, ..., Z = 35
4. Interpret the string as a decimal integer and compute the remainder of that number on division by 97

If the remainder is 1, the check digit test is passed and the IBAN might be valid.

Example (fictitious United Kingdom bank, sort code 12-34-56, account number 98765432):

• IBAN:	GB82 WEST 1234 5698 7654 32
• Rearrange:	W E S T12345698765432 G B82
• Convert to integer:	3214282912345698765432161182
• Compute remainder:	3214282912345698765432161182	mod 97 = 1

==== Generating IBAN check digits ====
According to the ECBS "generation of the IBAN shall be the exclusive responsibility of the bank/branch servicing the account". The ECBS document replicates part of the ISO/IEC 7064:2003 standard as a method for generating check digits in the range 02 to 98. Check digits in the ranges 00 to 96, 01 to 97, and 03 to 99 will also provide validation of an IBAN, but the standard is silent as to whether or not these ranges may be used.

The preferred algorithm is:

1. Check that the total IBAN length is correct as per the country. If not, the IBAN is invalid.
2. Replace the two check digits by 00 (e.g., GB00 for the UK).
3. Move the four initial characters to the end of the string.
4. Replace the letters in the string with digits, expanding the string as necessary, such that 'A' or 'a' = 10, 'B' or 'b' = 11, and 'Z' or 'z' = 35. (All letters treat as uppercase.) Each alphabetic character is therefore replaced by 2 digits. Technically, this is ASCII value of the corresponding uppercase letter decreased by 55 (decimal). The code of 'A' = 41(hex) = 65(decimal) in ASCII, up to 'Z' = 5A(hex) = 90(decimal), this gives you rule of ASCII value of the letter −55.
5. Convert the string to an integer (i.e. ignore leading zeroes).
6. Calculate mod-97 of the new number, which results in the remainder.
7. Subtract the remainder from 98 and use the result for the two check digits. If the result is a single-digit number, pad it with a leading 0 to make a two-digit number.

==== Modulo operation on IBAN ====
Any computer programming language or software package that is used to compute D mod 97 directly must have the ability to handle integers of more than 60 digits. In practice, this can only be done by software that either supports arbitrary-precision arithmetic or that can handle 219-bit (unsigned) integers, (Note: The IBAN value, ZZ59ZZZZZZZZZZZZZZZZZZZZZZZZZZZZZZ, is converted to the largest possible integer, approximately 3.5 × 10^{65} per ISO 7064 MOD-97-10 (before taking the modulus). 2^{219} - 1 is approximately equal to 8.4 × 10^{65}, thus 219-bit unsigned integers can accommodate all valid IBAN values.) features that are often not standard. If the application software in use does not provide the ability to handle integers of this size, the modulo operation can be performed in a piece-wise manner (as is the case with the UN CEFACT TBG5 JavaScript program).

Piece-wise calculation D mod 97 can be done in many ways. One such way is as follows:

1. Starting from the leftmost digit of D, construct a number using the first 9 digits and call it N. (Note: 2^{31} is approximately equal to 2.1 × 10^{9}, making it possible for any 9-digit integer to be handled using 32 bit integer arithmetic)
2. Calculate N mod 97.
3. Construct a new 9-digit N by concatenating the above result (step 2) with the next 7 or 8 digits of D. If there are fewer than 7 digits remaining in D but at least one, then construct a new N, which will have less than 9 digits, from the above result (step 2) followed by the remaining digits of D
4. Repeat steps 2–3 until all the digits of D have been processed

The result of the final calculation in step 2 will be D mod 97 = N mod 97.

===== Example =====
In this example, the above algorithm for D mod 97 will be applied to D = 3214282912345698765432161182. (The digits are colour-coded to aid the description below.) If the result is one, the IBAN corresponding to D passes the check digit test.

1. Construct N from the first 9 digits of D
  N = 321428291
2. Calculate N mod 97 = 70
3. Construct a new 9-digit N from the above result (step 2) followed by the next 7 digits of D.
  N = 702345698
4. Calculate N mod 97 = 29
5. Construct a new 9-digit N from the above result (step 4) followed by the next 7 digits of D.
  N = 297654321
6. Calculate N mod 97 = 24
7. Construct a new N from the above result (step 6) followed by the remaining 5 digits of D.
  N = 2461182
8. Calculate N mod 97 = 1

From step 8, the final result is D mod 97 = 1 and the IBAN has passed this check digit test.

=== National check digits ===
In addition to the IBAN check digits, many countries have their own national check digits used within the BBAN, as part of their national account number formats. Each country determines its own algorithm used for assigning and validating the national check digits - some relying on international standards, some inventing their own national standard, and some allowing each bank to decide if or how to implement them. Some algorithms apply to the entire BBAN, and others to one or more of the fields within it. The check digits may be considered an integral part of the account number, or an external field separate from the account number, depending on the country's rules.

Most of the variations used are based on two categories of algorithms:

- ISO 7064 MOD-97-10: Treat the account number as a large integer, divide it by 97 and use the remainder or its complement as the check digit(s).

- Weighted sum: Treat the account number as a series of individual numbers, multiply each number by a weight value according to its position in the string, sum the products, divide the sum by a modulus (10, 11 or 26) and use the remainder or its complement as the check digit or letter.

In both cases, there may first be a translation from alphanumeric characters to numbers using conversion tables. The complement, if used, means the remainder r is subtracted from a fixed value, usually the modulus or the modulus plus one (with the common exception that a remainder of 0 results in 0, denoted as 0 → 0, as opposed to e.g. 0 → 97 meaning that if the remainder is zero the checksum is 97). Some national specifications define the weights order from right to left, but since the BBAN length in the IBAN is fixed, they can be used from left to right as well.

National check digits in the International Bank Account Number system
Country	Algorithm	Weights	Modulo	Complement	Comments
Albania	Weighted	9, 7, 3, 1, 9, 7, 3, 1	10	10 − r, 0 → 0	Applies only to the bank code + branch code fields.
Belgium	ISO 7064 MOD-97-10 (variant)		97	r, 0 → 97	Applied to bank code + account number.
Bosnia and Herzegovina	ISO 7064 MOD-97-10		97	98 − r	
Croatia	ISO 7064 MOD-11-10		11, 10	11 − r	Calculated separately for the bank code (seven digits) and account number (ten digits). The last digit of each value is its check digit.
Czech Republic	Weighted	6, 3, 7, 9, 10, 5, 8, 4, 2, 1	11	11 − r, 0 → 0	Calculated separately for the account number (ten digits) and branch number (six digits, using the last six weights). The last digit of each value is its check digit.
East Timor	ISO 7064 MOD-97-10		97	98 − r	Applied to the whole bban (bank code concatenated with account number).
Estonia	Weighted	7, 1, 3, 7, 1, 3, 7, 1, 3, 7, 1, 3, 7	10	10 − r, 0 → 0	Applies only to the branch code + account number fields (ignoring the bank code).
Finland	Luhn	2, 1, 2, 1, 2, 1, 2, 1, 2, 1, 2, 1, 2	10	10 − r, 0 → 0	Uses the Luhn Algorithm, where the sum is taken of the individual digits of the multiplication products rather than the products themselves.
France	ISO 7064 MOD-97-10 (variant)		97	97 − r	The mapping form characters to coefficients is non-standard: the digits 0–9 are converted to their respective values, letters 'A–I' converted to 1–9, letters J–R converted to 1–9 and letters S–Z converted to 2–9, respectively.
Hungary	Weighted	9, 7, 3, 1, 9, 7, 3, 1, 9, 7, 3, 1, 9, 7, 3, 1	10	10 − r, 0 → 0	There are two separate check digits—one for the bank code + branch code, and one for the account number, each calculated separately.
Iceland	Weighted	3, 2, 7, 6, 5, 4, 3, 2	11	11 − r, 0 → 0	Applies only to the first eight digits of the national identification number (kennitala), with the check digit stored at the 9th.
Italy	Conversion + Sum		26	r	Characters are converted to digits using two different conversion tables, one for odd positions and one for even positions (the first character is considered odd). Odd-positioned digits 0–9 are converted to their respective values in the sequence 1, 0, 5, 7, 9, 13, 15, 17, 19, 21, and characters in the range A–Z are converted to 1, 0, 5, 7, 9, 13, 15, 17, 19, 21, 2, 4, 18, 20, 11, 3, 6, 8, 12, 14, 16, 10, 22, 25, 24, 23 respectively. Even-positioned characters are converted using the natural zero-based value, i.e. digits 0–9 converted to the respective numbers 0–9, and letters A–Z to the range 0–25. After conversion the numbers are summed (without weights), and the result taken modulo 26. This is then converted back into a single letter in the range A–Z (in natural order) which is used as the check digit (or rather, check character).
Mauritania	ISO 7064 MOD-97-10 (variant)		97	97 − r	
Monaco	ISO 7064 MOD-97-10 (variant)		97	97 − r	Uses the same algorithm as France.
Montenegro	ISO 7064 MOD-97-10		97	98 − r	
North Macedonia	ISO 7064 MOD-97-10		97	98 − r	
Norway	Weighted	5, 4, 3, 2, 7, 6, 5, 4, 3, 2	11	11 − r, 0 → 0, 1 → invalid	If the first two digits of the account number (not the bank code) are both zeros, then the calculation applies only to the remaining four digits of the account number, otherwise it applies to the entire BBAN (bank code + account number).
Poland	Weighted	3, 9, 7, 1, 3, 9, 7	10	10 − r, 0 → 0	Applies only to the bank code + branch code (without the account number).
Portugal	ISO 7064 MOD-97-10		97	98 − r	
San Marino	Conversion + Sum		26	r	Uses the same algorithm as Italy.
Serbia	ISO 7064 MOD-97-10		97	98 − r	
Slovakia	Weighted	6, 3, 7, 9, 10, 5, 8, 4, 2, 1	11	11 − r, 0 → 0	Calculated separately for the account number (ten digits) and branch number (six digits, using the last six weights). Same as Czech Republic.
Slovenia	ISO 7064 MOD-97-10		97	98 − r	
Spain	Weighted	1, 2, 4, 8, 5, 10, 9, 7, 3, 6	11	11 − r, 0 → 0, 1 → 1	There are two separate check digits—one for the bank code + branch code, and one for the account number, each calculated separately. The account number is ten characters long and uses all of the weights, whereas the bank code + branch code are eight characters long and thus use only the last eight weights in the calculation (or equivalently, pad with two zeros on the left and use the ten weights).
Sweden					The algorithm and the digits to which it applies vary from bank to bank.
Tunisia	ISO 7064 MOD-97-10 (variant)		97	97 − r	

== Adoption ==
Adoption of the IBAN IBAN structure is defined IBAN structure is registered with SWIFT Country participates in SEPA Euro is country's currency

International bank transactions use either an IBAN or the ISO 9362 Business Identifier Code system (BIC or SWIFT code) in conjunction with the BBAN (Basic Bank Account Number).

=== EEA and territories ===
The banks of most countries in Europe publish account numbers using both the IBAN format and the nationally recognised identifiers, this being mandatory within the European Economic Area.

Day-to-day administration of banking in British Overseas Territories varies from territory to territory; some, such as South Georgia and the South Sandwich Islands, have too small a population to warrant a banking system while others, such as Bermuda, have a thriving financial sector. The use of the IBAN is up to the local government—Gibraltar, formerly part of the European Union is required to use the IBAN, as are the Crown Dependencies, which use the British clearing system, and the British Virgin Islands have chosen to do so. As of April 2013, no other British Overseas Territories have chosen to use the IBAN. Banks in the Caribbean Netherlands also do not use the IBAN.

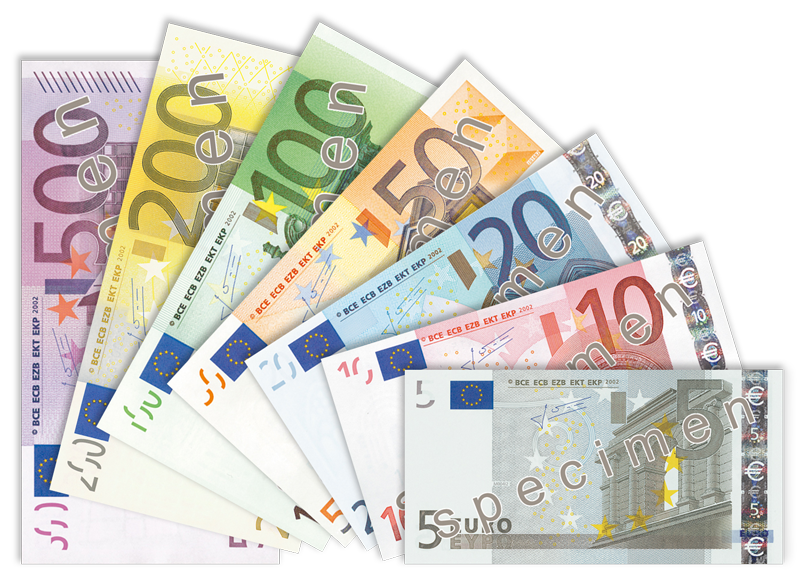
As of February 2014, the IBAN is mandatory for all banking transactions in countries that use the euro.

==== Single Euro Payments Area ====
The IBAN designation scheme was chosen as the foundation for electronic straight-through processing in the European Economic Area. The European Parliament mandated that a bank charge needs to be the same amount for domestic credit transfers as for cross-border credit transfers regulated in decision 2560/2001 (updated in 924/2009). This regulation took effect in 2003. Only payments in euro up to €12,500 to a bank account designated by its IBAN were covered by the regulation, not payments in other currencies.

The Euro Payments regulation was the foundation for the decision to create a Single Euro Payments Area (SEPA). The European Central Bank has created the TARGET Services network that unifies the technical infrastructure of the 26 central banks of the European Union (although Sweden has opted out). SEPA is a self-regulatory initiative by the banking sector of Europe as represented in the European Payments Council (EPC). The European Union made the scheme mandatory through the Payment Services Directive published in 2007. Since January 2008, all countries were required to support SEPA credit transfer, and SEPA direct debit was required to be supported since November 2009. The regulation on SEPA payments increased the charge cap (same price for domestic payments as for cross-border payments) to €50,000.

With a further decision of the European Parliament, the IBAN scheme for bank accounts fully replaced the domestic numbering schemes from 31 December 2012. On 16 December 2010, the European Commission published regulations that made IBAN support mandatory for domestic credit transfer by 2013 and for domestic direct debit by 2014 (with a 12 and 24 months transition period respectively). Some countries had already replaced their traditional bank account scheme by IBAN. This included Switzerland where IBAN was introduced for national credit transfer on 1 January 2006 and the support for the old bank account numbers was not required from 1 January 2010.

Based on a 20 December 2011 memorandum, the EU parliament resolved the mandatory dates for the adoption of the IBAN on 14 February 2012. On 1 February 2014, all national systems for credit transfer and direct debit were abolished and replaced by an IBAN-based system. This was then extended to all cross-border SEPA transactions on 1 February 2016 (Article 5 Section 7). After these dates the IBAN is sufficient to identify an account for home and foreign financial transactions in SEPA countries and banks are no longer permitted to require that the customer supply the BIC for the beneficiary's bank.

In the run-up to the 1 February 2014 deadline, it became apparent that many old bank account numbers had not been allocated IBANs—an issue that was addressed on a country-by-country basis. In Germany, for example, Deutsche Bundesbank and the German Banking Industry Committee required that all holders of German bank codes ("Bankleitzahl") published the specifics of their IBAN generation format taking into account not only the generation of check digits but also the handling of legacy bank codes, thereby enabling third parties to generate IBANs independently of the bank. The first such catalogue was published in June 2013 as a variant of the old bank code catalog ("Bankleitzahlendatei").

=== Non-EEA ===
Banks in numerous non-European countries including most states of the Middle East, North Africa and the Caribbean have implemented the IBAN format for account identification. In some countries the IBAN is used on an ad hoc basis, an example was Ukraine where account numbers used for international transfers by some domestic banks had additional aliases that followed the IBAN format as a precursor to formal SWIFT registration. This practice in Ukraine ended on 1 November 2019 when all Ukrainian banks had fully switched to the IBAN standard.

The degree to which a bank verifies the validity of a recipient's bank account number depends on the configuration of the transmitting bank's software—many major software packages supply bank account validation as a standard function. Some banks outside Europe may not recognize IBAN, though this is expected to diminish with time. Non-European banks usually accept IBANs for accounts in Europe, although they might not treat IBANs differently from other foreign bank account numbers. In particular, they might not check the IBAN's validity prior to sending the transfer.

Banks in the United States do not use IBAN as account numbers for U.S. accounts and use ABA routing transit numbers. Any adoption of the IBAN standard by U.S. banks would likely be initiated by ANSI ASC X9, the U.S. financial services standards development organization: a working group (X9B20) was established as an X9 subcommittee to generate an IBAN construction for U.S. bank accounts.

Canadian financial institutions have not adopted IBAN and use routing numbers issued by Payments Canada for domestic transfers, and SWIFT for international transfers. There is no formal governmental or private sector regulatory requirement in Canada for the major banks to use IBAN.

Australia and New Zealand do not use IBAN. They use Bank State Branch codes for domestic transfers and SWIFT for international transfers.

=== IBAN formats by country ===
This table summarises the IBAN formats by country:

- The kk after the two-character ISO country code represents the check digits calculated from the rest of the IBAN characters. If it is a constant for the country concerned, this will be stated in the Comments column. This happens where the BBAN has its own check digits that use the same algorithm as the IBAN check digits
- The BBAN format column shows the format of the BBAN part of an IBAN in terms of upper case alpha characters (A–Z) denoted by "a", numeric characters (0–9) denoted by "n" and mixed case alphanumeric characters (a–z, A–Z, 0–9) denoted by "c". For example, the Bulgarian BBAN (4a,6n,8c) consists of 4 alpha characters, followed by 6 numeric characters, then by 8 mixed-case alpha-numeric characters
- Descriptions in the Comments field have been standardised with country-specific names in brackets. The format of the various fields can be deduced from the BBAN field

International Bank Account Number formats by country
Country	Chars	BBAN format	IBAN Fields	Comment
Albania	28	8n,16c	ALkk bbbs sssx cccc cccc cccc cccc	b = National bank code s = Branch code x = National check digits c = Account number
Andorra	24	8n,12c	ADkk bbbb ssss cccc cccc cccc	b = National bank code s = Branch code c = Account number
Austria	20	16n	ATkk bbbb bccc cccc cccc	b = National bank code c = Account number
Azerbaijan	28	4a,20c	AZkk bbbb cccc cccc cccc cccc cccc	b = National bank code c = Account number
Bahrain	22	4a,14c	BHkk bbbb cccc cccc cccc cc	b = National bank code c = Account number
Belarus	28	4c, 4n, 16c	BYkk bbbb aaaa cccc cccc cccc cccc	b = National bank or branch code a = Balance account number c = Account number
Belgium	16	12n	BEkk bbbc cccc ccxx	b = National bank code c = Account number x = National check digits
Bosnia and Herzegovina	20	16n	BAkk bbbs sscc cccc ccxx	k = IBAN check digits (always "39") b = National bank code s = Branch code c = Account number x = National check digits
Brazil	29	23n,1a,1c	BRkk bbbb bbbb ssss sccc cccc ccct n	b = National bank code s = Branch code c = Account number t = Account type (cheque account, savings account etc.) n = Owner account number ("1", "2" etc.)
Bulgaria	22	4a,6n,8c	BGkk bbbb ssss ttcc cccc cc	b = BIC bank code s = Branch (BAE) number t = Account type c = Account number
Burundi	27	5n, 5n, 11n, 2n	BIkk bbbb bsss sscc cccc cccc ccc	b = National bank code s = Branch identifier c = Account number
Costa Rica	22	18n	CRkk 0bbb cccc cccc cccc cc	0 = always zero b = bank code c = Account number
Croatia	21	17n	HRkk bbbb bbbc cccc cccc c	b = Bank code c = Account number
Cyprus	28	8n,16c	CYkk bbbs ssss cccc cccc cccc cccc	b = National bank code s = Branch code c = Account number
Czech Republic	24	20n	CZkk bbbb pppp ppcc cccc cccc	b = National bank code p = Account number prefix c = Account number
Denmark	18	14n	DKkk bbbb cccc cccc cx	b = National bank code c = Account number x = National check digit
Djibouti	27	5n, 5n, 11n, 2n	DJkk bbbb bsss sscc cccc cccc ccc	b = National bank code s = Branch identifier c = Account number
Dominican Republic	28	4c,20n	DOkk bbbb cccc cccc cccc cccc cccc	b = Bank identifier c = Account number
East Timor	23	19n	TLkk bbbc cccc cccc cccc cxx	k = IBAN check digits (always = "38") b = Bank identifier c = Account number x = National check digits
Egypt	29	25n	EGkk bbbb ssss cccc cccc cccc cccc c	b = National bank code s = Branch code c = Account number
El Salvador	28	4a, 20n	SVkk bbbb cccc cccc cccc cccc cccc	b = National bank code c = Account number
Estonia	20	16n	EEkk bbss cccc cccc cccx	b = National bank code s = Branch code c = Account number x = National check digit
Falkland Islands	18	2a,12n	FKkk bbcc cccc cccc cc	b = National bank code c = Account number
Faroe Islands (Note: Registered at SWIFT as part of Denmark, but with its own country code.)	18	14n	FOkk bbbb cccc cccc cx	b = National bank code c = Account number x = National check digit
Finland	18	14n	FIkk bbbb bbcc cccc cx	b = Bank and branch code c = Account number x = National check digit
France (Note: French Guiana, French Polynesia, French Southern Territories, Guadeloupe, Martinique, Mayotte, New Caledonia, Réunion, Saint Barthélemy, Saint Martin (French part), Saint Pierre and Miquelon, and Wallis and Futuna Islands have their own ISO country code but use "FR" as their IBAN country code.)	27	10n,11c,2n	FRkk bbbb bsss sscc cccc cccc cxx	b = National bank code s = Branch code (code guichet) c = Account number x = National check digits (clé RIB)
Georgia	22	2a,16n	GEkk bbcc cccc cccc cccc cc	b = National bank code c = Account number
Germany	22	18n	DEkk bbbb bbbb cccc cccc cc	b = Bank and branch identifier (Bankleitzahl or BLZ) c = Account number
Gibraltar	23	4a,15c	GIkk bbbb cccc cccc cccc ccc	b = BIC bank code c = Account number
Greece	27	7n,16c	GRkk bbbs sssc cccc cccc cccc ccc	b = National bank code s = Branch code c = Account number
Greenland	18	14n	GLkk bbbb cccc cccc cx	b = National bank code c = Account number x = National check digit
Guatemala	28	4c,20c	GTkk bbbb mmtt cccc cccc cccc cccc	b = National bank code c = Account number m = Currency code t = Account type
Honduras	28	4a,20n	HNkk bbbb cccc cccc cccc cccc cccc	b = National bank code c = Account number
Hungary	28	24n	HUkk bbbs sssx cccc cccc cccc cccx	b = National bank code s = Branch code c = Account number x = National check digit
Iceland	26	22n	ISkk bbss ttcc cccc iiii iiii ii	b = National bank code s = Branch code t = Account type c = Account number i = Account holder's kennitala (national identification number)
Iraq	23	4a,15n	IQkk bbbb sssc cccc cccc ccc	b = National bank code s = Branch code c = Account number
Ireland	22	4a,6n,8n	IEkk qqqq bbbb bbcc cccc cc	q = BIC bank code b = Bank/branch code (sort code) c = Account number
Israel	23	19n	ILkk bbbs sscc cccc cccc ccc	b = National bank code s = Branch code c = Account number 13 digits (padded with zeros)
Italy	27	1a,10n,12c	ITkk xbbb bbss sssc cccc cccc ccc	x = Check character (codice CIN) b = National bank code (codice ABI) s = Branch code (codice CAB) c = Account number
Jordan	30	4a,4n,18c	JOkk bbbb ssss cccc cccc cccc cccc cc	b = National bank code s = Branch code c = Account number
Kazakhstan	20	3n,13c	KZkk bbbc cccc cccc cccc	b = National bank code c = Account number
Kosovo	20	4n,10n,2n	XKkk bbbb cccc cccc cccc	b = National bank code c = Account number
Kuwait	30	4a,22c	KWkk bbbb cccc cccc cccc cccc cccc cc	b = National bank code c = Account number.
Latvia	21	4a,13c	LVkk bbbb cccc cccc cccc c	b = BIC bank code c = Account number
Lebanon	28	4n,20c	LBkk bbbb cccc cccc cccc cccc cccc	b = National bank code c = Account number
Libya	25	21n	LYkk bbbs sscc cccc cccc cccc c	b = National bank code s = Branch code c = Account number
Liechtenstein	21	5n,12c	LIkk bbbb bccc cccc cccc c	b = National bank code c = Account number
Lithuania	20	16n	LTkk bbbb bccc cccc cccc	b = National bank code c = Account number
Luxembourg	20	3n,13c	LUkk bbbc cccc cccc cccc	b = National bank code c = Account number
Malta	31	4a,5n,18c	MTkk bbbb ssss sccc cccc cccc cccc ccc	b = BIC bank code s = Branch code c = Account number
Mauritania	27	23n	MRkk bbbb bsss sscc cccc cccc cxx	k = IBAN check digits (always "13") b = National bank code s = Branch code (code guichet) c = Account number x = National check digits (clé RIB)
Mauritius	30	4a,19n,3a	MUkk bbbb bbss cccc cccc cccc 000m mm	b = National bank code s = Branch identifier c = Account number 0 = Zeroes m = Currency code
Monaco	27	10n,11c,2n	MCkk bbbb bsss sscc cccc cccc cxx	b = National bank code s = Branch code (code guichet) c = Account number x = National check digits (clé RIB).
Moldova	24	2c,18c	MDkk bbcc cccc cccc cccc cccc	b = National bank code c = Account number
Mongolia	20	4n,12n	MNkk bbbb cccc cccc cccc	b = National bank code c = Account number
Montenegro	22	18n	MEkk bbbc cccc cccc cccc xx	k = IBAN check digits (always = "25") b = Bank code c = Account number x = National check digits
Netherlands (Note: Not applicable to Aruba, Curaçao, Sint Maarten, and the Caribbean Netherlands.)	18	4a,10n	NLkk bbbb cccc cccc cx	b = BIC Bank code c = Account number x = Modulo-11 national check digit
Nicaragua	28	4a, 20n	NIkk aaaa cccc cccc cccc cccc cccc	a = National bank code c = Account number
North Macedonia	19	3n,10c,2n	MKkk bbbc cccc cccc cxx	k = IBAN check digits (always = "07") b = National bank code c = Account number x = National check digits
Norway	15	11n	NOkk bbbb cccc ccx	b = National bank code c = Account number x = Modulo-11 national check digit
Oman	23	3n,16c	OMkk bbbc cccc cccc cccc ccc	b = National bank code c = Account number
Pakistan	24	4a,16c	PKkk bbbb cccc cccc cccc cccc	b = National bank code c = Account number
Palestinian territories	29	4a,21c	PSkk bbbb cccc cccc cccc cccc cccc c	b = National bank code c = Account number
Poland	28	24n	PLkk bbbb bbbb cccc cccc cccc cccc	b = National bank code c = Account number
Portugal	25	21n	PTkk bbbb ssss cccc cccc cccx x	k = IBAN check digits (always = "50") b = National bank code (numeric only) s = Branch code (numeric only) c = Account number (numeric only) x = National check digits (numeric only)
Qatar	29	4a,21c	QAkk bbbb cccc cccc cccc cccc cccc c	b = National bank code c = Account number
Romania	24	4a,16c	ROkk bbbb cccc cccc cccc cccc	b = BIC Bank code (first four alpha characters) c = Branch code and account number (bank-specific format)
Russia (effective April 2023)	33	14n,15c	RUkk bbbb bbbb bsss sscc cccc cccc cccc c	b = Bank code s = Branch code c = Account number
Saint Lucia	32	4a,24c	LCkk bbbb cccc cccc cccc cccc cccc cccc	b = Bank code c = Account number
San Marino	27	1a,10n,12c	SMkk xbbb bbss sssc cccc cccc ccc	x = Check character (codice CIN) b = National bank code (codice ABI) s = Branch code (codice CAB) c = Account number
São Tomé and Príncipe	25	21n	STkk bbbb ssss cccc cccc cccc c	b = National bank code s = Branch number c = Account number
Saudi Arabia	24	2n,18c	SAkk bbcc cccc cccc cccc cccc	b = National bank code c = Account number preceded by zeros, if required
Serbia	22	18n	RSkk bbbc cccc cccc cccc xx	k = IBAN check digits (always = "35") b = National bank code c = Account number x = Account check digits
Seychelles	31	4a,20n,3a	SCkk bbbb bb ss cccc cccc cccc cccc mmm	b = Bank code s = Branch code c = Account number m = Currency code
Slovakia	24	20n	SKkk bbbb pppp ppcc cccc cccc	b = National bank code p = Account number prefix c = Account number
Slovenia	19	15n	SIkk bbss sccc cccc cxx	k = IBAN check digits (always = "56") b = National bank code s = Branch code c = Account number x = National check digits
Somalia	23	4n,3n, 12n	SOkk bbbb sssc cccc cccc ccc	b = National bank code s = Branch code c = Account number
Spain	24	20n	ESkk bbbb ssss xxcc cccc cccc	b = National bank s = Branch code x = Check digits c = Account number
Sudan	18	14n	SDkk bbcc cccc cccc cc	b = National bank code c = Account number
Sweden	24	20n	SEkk bbbc cccc cccc cccc cccx	b = National bank code c = Account number x = Check digits
Switzerland	21	5n,12c	CHkk bbbb bccc cccc cccc c	b = National bank code c = Code identifying a bank account
Tunisia	24	20n	TNkk bbss sccc cccc cccc ccxx	k = IBAN check digits (always "59") b = National bank code s = Branch code c = Account number x = National check digits
Turkey	26	5n,1n,16c	TRkk bbbb b0cc cccc cccc cccc cc	b = National bank code 0 = Zero (reserved) c = Account number
Ukraine	29	6n, 19c	UAkk bbbb bbcc cccc cccc cccc cccc c	b = Bank code c = Account number preceded by zeros, if required
United Arab Emirates	23	3n,16n	AEkk bbbc cccc cccc cccc ccc	b = National bank code c = Account number
United Kingdom (Note: The United Kingdom of Great Britain and Northern Ireland, the Isle of Man and the Bailiwicks of Guernsey and Jersey use this format. British Overseas Territories have their own formats — only Gibraltar and the British Virgin Islands use IBANs.)	22	4a,14n	GBkk bbbb ssss sscc cccc cc	b = BIC bank code s = Bank and branch code (sort code) c = Account number
Vatican City	22	3n,15n	VAkk bbbc cccc cccc cccc cc	b = National bank code c = Account number
Virgin Islands, British	24	4a,16n	VGkk bbbb cccc cccc cccc cccc	b = National bank code c = Account number
Yemen	30	4a,4n,18c	YEkk bbbb ssss cccc cccc cccc cccc cc	b = Bank code s = Branch code c = Account number

In addition to the above, the IBAN is under development in countries below but has not yet been catalogued for general international use.

In this list

- "kk" represent the IBAN checksum digits
- "a" represents an uppercase alpha character (A–Z)
- "c" represents an alphanumeric character (a–z, A–Z, 0–9)
- "n" represents a numeric character (0–9)

Aspirational country codes for International Bank Account Number
Country	Chars	BBAN format	Example
Algeria	26	22n	DZkk nnnn nnnn nnnn nnnn nnnn nn
Angola	25	21n	AOkk nnnn nnnn nnnn nnnn nnnn n
Benin	28	2c, 22n	BJkk ccnn nnnn nnnn nnnn nnnn nnnn
Burkina Faso	28	2c, 22n	BFkk ccnn nnnn nnnn nnnn nnnn nnnn
Cabo Verde	25	21n	CVkk nnnn nnnn nnnn nnnn nnnn n
Cameroon	27	23n	CMkk nnnn nnnn nnnn nnnn nnnn nnn
Central African Republic	27	23n	CFkk nnnn nnnn nnnn nnnn nnnn nnn
Chad	27	23n	TDkk nnnn nnnn nnnn nnnn nnnn nnn
Comoros	27	23n	KMkk nnnn nnnn nnnn nnnn nnnn nnn
Congo, Republic of the	27	23n	CGkk nnnn nnnn nnnn nnnn nnnn nnn
Côte d'Ivoire	28	2a, 22n	CIkk aann nnnn nnnn nnnn nnnn nnnn
Equatorial Guinea	27	23n	GQkk nnnn nnnn nnnn nnnn nnnn nnn
Gabon	27	23n	GAkk nnnn nnnn nnnn nnnn nnnn nnn
Guinea-Bissau	25	2c, 19n	GWkk ccnn nnnn nnnn nnnn nnnn n
Iran	26	22n	IRkk nnnn nnnn nnnn nnnn nnnn nn
Madagascar	27	23n	MGkk nnnn nnnn nnnn nnnn nnnn nnn
Mali	28	2c, 22n	MLkk ccnn nnnn nnnn nnnn nnnn nnnn
Morocco	28	24n	MAkk nnnn nnnn nnnn nnnn nnnn nnnn
Mozambique	25	21n	MZkk nnnn nnnn nnnn nnnn nnnn n
Niger	28	2a, 22n	NEkk aann nnnn nnnn nnnn nnnn nnnn
Senegal	28	2a, 22n	SNkk aann nnnn nnnn nnnn nnnn nnnn
Togo	28	2a, 22n	TGkk aann nnnn nnnn nnnn nnnn nnnn

== See also ==
- Bank card number
- Bank regulation
- ABA routing transit number
- Routing number (Canada)
- EPC QR code
