= Barclaycard =

Barclays Bank credit card

- Company type: Brand
- Industry: Credit cards
- Founded: 1966; 60 years ago
- Headquarters: London, England, United Kingdom
- Area served: Worldwide
- Products: Credit cards Contactless technology
- Parent: Barclays
- Website: www.home.barclaycard

Barclaycard (/ˈbɑːrklikɑːrd, -leɪ-/; stylised in lowercase) is a brand of Barclays credit cards. It is considered one of the United Kingdom's largest credit card providers, with 5 million accounts.

== History ==
Barclays launched Barclaycard on 29 June 1966, initially as a charge card, but following Bank of England agreement to the offering of revolving credit, it became the first credit card in the United Kingdom on 8 November 1967. It enjoyed a monopoly of the credit card market in the United Kingdom until the introduction of the Access Card in October 1972.

Barclays was not the first issuer of a credit card in the United Kingdom though; Diners Club and American Express launched their charge cards in 1962 and 1963 respectively. Barclaycard was originally a BankAmericard licensee, and became part of the Visa network on its formation in September 1976.

In 2021, Barclaycard cut credit limits for over 100,000 customers, including customers who had never missed a payment. In some cases limits were cut by over 95%, resulting in "completely useless" credit limits.

== Products ==
In the United Kingdom, Barclaycard offers a range of credit cards for personal and business customers.

== Acquisitions ==
=== Providian ===
In July 2003, Barclays took over Monument, the United Kingdom branch of the U.S. bank Providian, when it was sold off due to financial irregularities of its American parent company. Barclaycard sold the Monument business and premises to CompuCredit Holdings Corporation in April 2007.

=== Egg ===
In March 2011, Barclays announced that it would be buying the British credit card business of Egg from Citigroup for an undisclosed price. At the time of the announcement, Barclays claimed that the credit card assets consisted of 1.15 million accounts with approximately £2.3bn of gross receivables. They intended to integrate those customers within their own credit card arm.

At the time of the announcement, Citi said it was "committed to working with Barclays on a seamless transfer of the customer accounts, ensuring continuation of the high level of service to which customers are accustomed".

=== Analog Analytics ===
In June 2012, Barclays acquired Analog Analytics, a digital coupon and daily deal business similar to Groupon.

=== The Logic Group ===
In September 2014, Barclays announced it was going to acquire The Logic Group, a managed payment and loyalty business. The acquisition would enable Barclaycard's clients to benefit from The Logic Group's single platform transaction processing capabilities, alongside data insights, which would allow merchants to better target their services to customers.

In late 2014, Barclays confirmed that the Logic Group acquisition has been finalised.
