= Charge card =

Credit card which must be paid in full

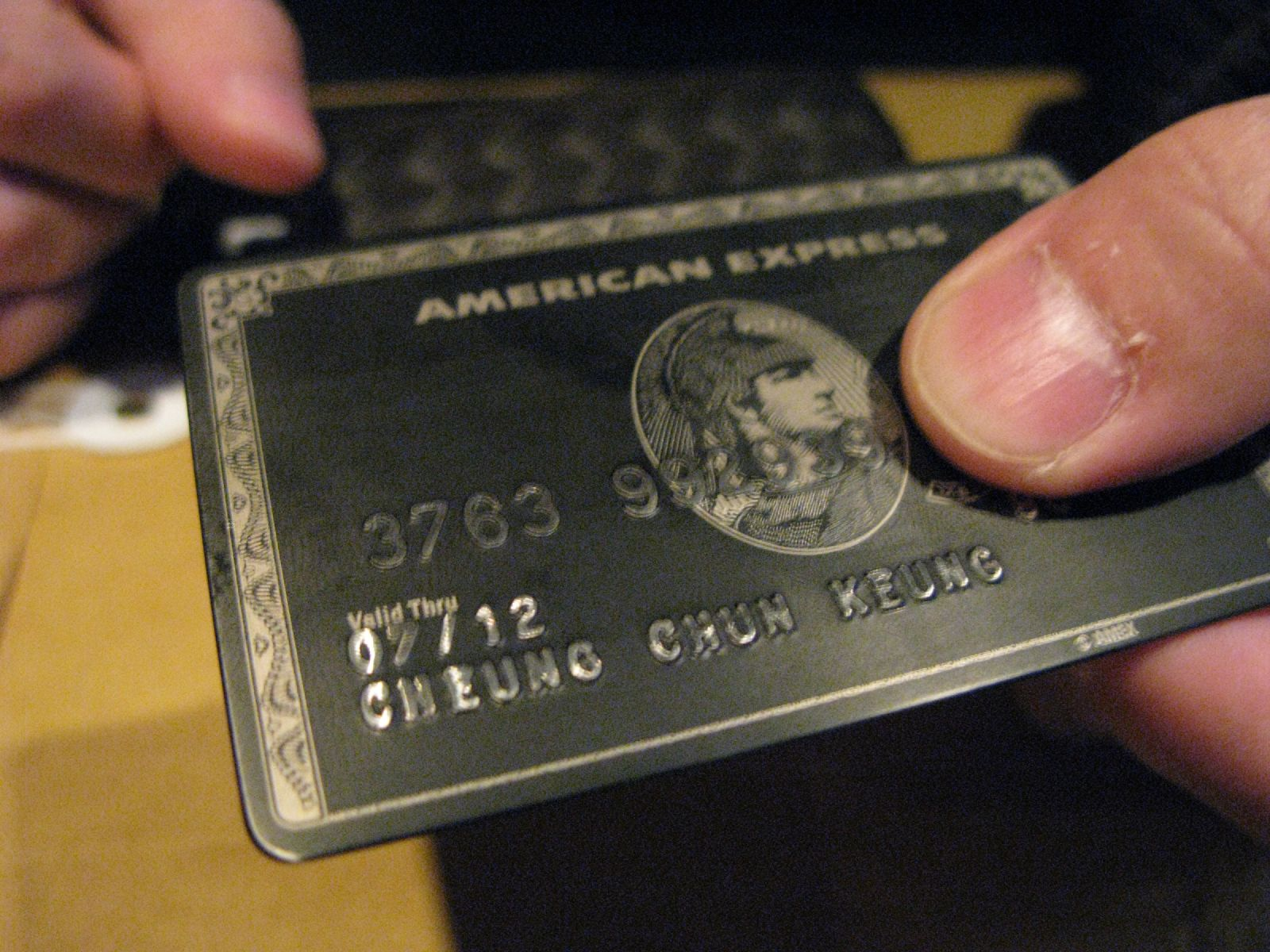
American Express Centurion Card is an example of charge card

A charge card is a type of credit card that enables the cardholder to make purchases which are paid for by the card issuer, to whom the cardholder becomes indebted. The cardholder is obliged to repay the debt to the card issuer in full by the due date, usually on a monthly basis, or be subject to late fees and restrictions on further card use. Charge cards are distinct from traditional credit cards, which are revolving credit instruments that do not need to be paid in full every month and a balance may be carried over, on which interest is paid. Charge cards are typically issued without spending limits, whereas credit cards usually have a specified credit limit that the cardholder may not exceed. Most charge cards are held by businesses, corporations or executives thereof, and are issued to customers with a good or excellent credit score.

== History ==
In 1914, Western Union opened the first charge account for its customers and provided them with a paper identification. There were many larger department stores which opened store charge accounts for their customers with paper identification, enabling the customer to make purchases on credit provided by the store. However, these accounts could be used only within the store which issued them.

In 1950, Diners Club began opening charge accounts with paper identification cards, directed at the travel and entertainment markets. The novel feature of these cards was that the charge card could be used in a large number of stores. These stores had to enter an agreement with Diners Club, and pay a fee to the company. For the fee, Diners Club carried the cost of setting up accounts, authorizing each transaction, processing transactions and collections, bore the financing costs and assumed the risk of cardholders defaulting. The new system was especially appealing to smaller stores in competition with the larger stores but who could not justify setting up their own charge account facilities. Eventually the larger stores began accepting these cards, testifying that the fees charged by the card operator were lower than the store's cost in running their own store accounts. In 1957, American Express also entered the field, and in 1959 was the first company to issue embossed plastic charge cards to ISO/IEC 7810 standards.

In Europe, the MasterCard-affiliated Maestro brand (which is a debit card rather than a charge card) replaced the European Eurocheque brand for payment cards in 2002. Many Eurocheque cards, particularly in such countries as Austria and Germany, were charge cards branded with the Eurocheque logo. In addition, the European Eurocard, issued as the competitor for American Express was, and in some countries (such as the Nordic countries) still is, a charge card. Therefore, the majority of MasterCards in these countries still are charge cards. Visa charge cards are also available in Europe.

== Operation ==
The user of the charge card has to pay their account balance at the end of each month and the charge card company, unlike a credit card, does not charge interest. A charge card company's main source of revenue is the merchant fee, which is a percentage of the transaction value which typically ranges between 1 and 4%, plus an interchange or minimum fee.

Many charge cards have the option for users to pay for some purchases over time. American Express charge card customers, for instance, can enroll in the Extended Payment Option (internally referred to as ExPO) to be able to pay for purchases over $200 over time, or in Sign & Travel to be able to pay for eligible travel-related expenses over time.

Most charge cards also have a feature called No Preset Spending Limit (NPSL). While consumers often take NPSL to mean that their cards are without limits, NPSL really means that a card's limit changes, often from month-to-month, based on factors such as consumer charging and payment history as well overall economic trends. According to a WalletHub.com NPSL study, the way NPSL charge cards are reported to the major credit bureaus varies by issuer and can lead to artificial increases in credit utilization, thereby lowering one's FICO Score.

Governments and large businesses often use charge cards to pay for and keep track of expenses related to official business; these are often referred to as purchasing cards. Many retailers and banks issue charge cards to customers. Some American Express and Diners Club cards are charge cards, rather than credit or debit cards such as Visa and MasterCard. The Coutts Silk Charge Card and the Centurion Card are famous charge cards.

== See also ==
- Card (disambiguation)
- Credit card
- Debit card
- Payment card
