= ZKA =

ZKA is the abbreviation of

- Zentraler Kreditausschuss
- Zollkriminalamt
