= Eurocard =

Eurocard may be:

- Eurocard (printed circuit board), a European standard for printed circuit boards
- Eurocard (payment card), a European brand of charge cards
