= Account number =

Account number may refer to:

- A number used to identify a bank account
- Payment card number, the primary account number found on credit cards and bank cards
- International Bank Account Number, an international standard for identifying bank accounts across national borders
- National identification number, a personal reference issued by governments
