= Ola, Texas =

Ola, Texas may refer to one of the following places in the US state of Texas:

- Ola, Texas, former name of Casa Linda Estates, Dallas
- Ola, Kaufman County, Texas, a community in eastern Texas

== See also ==
- Ola (disambiguation)
- OLA (disambiguation)
