= International Payments Framework =

The International Payments Framework (IPF) was an initiative launched in 2010 to create a global framework for payment processing by the International Payments Framework Association, a trade association headquartered in Atlanta, in the United States. The initiative and the association concluded in 2023 after achieving its objectives.

== Overview ==
IPF creates rules, processes, and inter-member agreements that allow IPF's members to minimize the cost of cross-border payments. Its members include the United States Federal Reserve and other central banks, as well as other payments industry entities such as financial institutions and ACH operators.

== Comparison ==
IPF is similar to the Single Euro Payments Area (SEPA) in that both initiatives aim to facilitate international payments, base their standards on ISO 20022, and involve mostly banks as their main participants.

IPF differs from SEPA because IPF is global rather than limited to Europe; IPF is market-based rather than a political initiative; IPF involves more public entities, smaller banks, and clearing houses, rather than larger banks; and IPF superimposes a standard that allows existing national standards to communicate with each other rather than replacing them with a new standard. Unlike SEPA documentation, which is available on the European Payments Council's website, IPF documentation is not available to the public.

== See also ==
- Single Euro Payments Area
- Financial Information eXchange
- Electronic Banking Internet Communication Standard
- ISO 20022
