= German Banking Industry Committee =

German industry association

The German Banking Industry Committee (GBIC) (German: Die Deutsche Kreditwirtschaft / DK), known until 2011 as the Central Credit Committee (German: Zentraler Kreditausschuss / ZKA) is an industry association of the German banking industry. Its decisions are held normative for the national banking sector – either directly by interbank treaties or indirectly by preparing a corresponding ministerial or Bundesbank decision.

== History ==
The Central Credit Committee was founded in 1932 as a common interest group of the five federal interest groups that represent the financial sector in Germany.

Until August 2011, the association was known as the Central Credit Committee (German: Zentraler Kreditausschuss / ZKA) when it adopted a new name (after almost eighty years).

== Structure ==
The five founding associations are:

- Bundesverband der Deutschen Volksbanken und Raiffeisenbanken (BVR, lit. 'Federal Association of German co-operative Banks'; est. 1864 as Allgemeiner Verband der auf Selbsthilfe beruhenden Deutschen Erwerbs- und Wirtschaftsgenossenschaften)
- Bundesverband deutscher Banken (BdB, lit. 'Federal Association of German [commercial] Banks'; est. 1901 as Centralverband des deutschen Bank- und Bankiergewerbes)
- Bundesverband Öffentlicher Banken Deutschlands (VÖB, lit. 'Federal Association of Public-sector Banks'; est. 1916 as Verband deutscher öffentlich-rechtlicher Kreditanstalten)
- Deutscher Sparkassen- und Giroverband (DSGV, lit. 'German Association of Savings Banks and Money Transfers'; est. 1884 as Deutscher Sparkassenverband)
- Verband deutscher Pfandbriefbanken (vdp, lit. 'Association of German Covered Bond Banks'; est. 1902 as Sonderausschuss Hypothekenbanken)

By indirection of these associations the Central Credit Committee represents 2,300 financial institutions (2005). The committee itself is not an institution – it is neither registered, nor does it have a postal address. The committee presidency changes annually rotating among the associations for private banks, for savings banks and for co-operative banks.

The Central Credit Committee resolves "common statements" (decided unanimously) representing the view of the German banking industry on a topic. The statements are published thereby influencing decisions of other institutions like the Federal Financial Supervisory Authority, the Bundesbank or decision-making bodies of the European Union. Publication and press releases are the main task of the presiding association.

Additionally the Central Credit Committee supervises joint committees of the German banking industry like the Central Competition Committee (Zentrale Wettbewerbsausschuss) or the Working Group on Automatic Teller Machines.

== Standards in electronic banking ==
The Central Credit Committee has created the standards in electronic banking which are resolved by proposing agreements (Abkommen) that are joined by the banking institutions. Banking institutions that are members of one of the associations in the ZKA are naturally bound to join these.

- Abkommen über die Datenfernübertragung zwischen Kunden und Kreditinstitute (DFÜ-Abkommen / RDT agreement - includes the EBICS protocol)
- Vereinbarung über den beleglosen Datenaustausch in der zwischenbetrieblichen Abwicklung des Inlandszahlungsverkehrs (Clearingabkommen / clearing agreement)
- Vereinbarung über die Richtlinien für einheitliche Zahlungsverkehrsvordrucke (payment blank form guidelines)
- Homebanking-Abkommen (online banking agreement – includes the HBCI protocol)
- Abkommen zum Überweisungsverkehr (direct credit transfer agreement)
- Abkommen über den Einzug von Schecks (Scheckabkommen / cheque agreement)
- Abkommen über den Einzug von Reiseschecks (Reisescheckabkommen / traveler's cheque agreement)
- Abkommen über den Lastschriftverkehr (Lastschriftabkommen / direct debit transfer agreement)
- Abkommen über den Einzug von Wechseln und die Rückgabe nicht eingelöster und zurückgerufener Wechsel (Wechselabkommen / promissory notes agreement)
- Vereinbarung über das eurocheque-System (arrangement on the eurocheque system – practically defunct since 2002)
- Vereinbarung über die Absicherung der ec-PIN (arrangement on the eurocheque debit card safety – later Maestro debit card)
- Vereinbarung über das deutsche ec-Geldautomaten-System (arrangement on the eurocheque cash machine system – later called Girocard service)
- Vereinbarung über die Festsetzung einer Höchstgebühr für die Benutzung der institutsübergreifenden Geldautomaten (arrangement on the maximum fees for interbank network cash machines)
- Vereinbarung über ein institutsübergreifendes System zur bargeldlosen Zahlung an automatisierten Kassen (electronic-cash-System / arrangement on the electronic cash systems)
- Vereinbarung zum POZ-System (arrangement on point of sale delayed debit systems)
- Vereinbarung über das institutsübergreifende System „GeldKarte” (arrangement on the GeldKarte stored-value card system)

== European Economic Area ==
The creation of the single market of the European Union (1993) and the introduction of the Eurozone (1999/2002) has made for a shift to make decisions on a European scale. As a consequence the European Committee for Banking Standards (ECBS) was founded in December 1992 and the European Payments Council (EPC) was created in summer 2002. These drive the development of the Single Euro Payments Area (SEPA) and the ZKA is supervising the EPC working groups by creating their own ZKA working groups mirroring the structure of the EPC.

== See also ==
- List of banks in Germany
