= OLA =

OLA may stand for:

- United Nations Office of Legal Affairs
- Official Languages Act 2003, Ireland
- Oklahoma Library Association
- Online authorisation
- Ontario Lacrosse Association
- Ontario Legislative Assembly
- Ontario Library Association
- Open Learning Agency, British Columbia, Canada
- Operational-level agreement in support of a service-level agreement
- WebSphere Optimized Local Adapters, IBM software
- Oregon Library Association
- Oromo Liberation Army, armed opposition group in Ethiopia and former armed wing of the OLF
- Ostseeland Verkehrs Gmbh, a Transdev Germany railway
- Our Lady of the Abandoned Parish Church (Marikina), Philippines
- Missionary Sisters of Our Lady of the Apostles, a Catholic congregation
- Overlap–add method in signal processing
- Overland Airways, ICAO airline code OLA
- Our Lady of the Angels School (Illinois)
- OLA Girls Senior High School (Ho), Ghana
- OLA Girls Senior High School (Kenyasi), Ghana
