= Electron Bio-Imaging Centre =

UK scientific laboratory

electron Bio-Imaging Centre
- eBIC
- Established: 2018; 8 years ago
- Field of research: Structural Biology
- Director: Peijun Zhang
- Staff: 49
- Location: Didcot, United Kingdom; 51°34′22″N 1°18′44″W
- Campus: Harwell Science and Innovation Campus
- Affiliations: Birkbeck College; Oxford University; Diamond Light Source
- Website: www.diamond.ac.uk/Instruments/Biological-Cryo-Imaging/eBIC.html

The electron Bio-Imaging Centre (eBIC) is a national facility in the United Kingdom that houses equipment and specialists for structural biology using Cryogenic electron microscopy.

== History ==
Opening in 2018, eBIC was established at Diamond Light Source in collaboration with Birkbeck College, Oxford University and Thermo Fisher via a £15.6 million grant from the Wellcome Trust, the Medical Research Council and the Biotechnology and Biological Sciences Research Council.

== Activities ==
The Electron Bio Imaging Centre supports Single particle analysis, Cryogenic electron tomography, and Microcrystal electron diffraction.

eBIC's imaging facilities have contributed to vaccine development, including the Oxford–AstraZeneca COVID-19 vaccine and a polio vaccine using virus-like particles Additionally, their microscopes were used for determining structures of the SARS-CoV-2 spike protein.

The facility also operates an 'eBIC for Industry' centre for industrial users to access specific equipment and expertise, training, or mail-in or full service Single particle structure determination.

Research at eBIC includes electron ptychography, FIB-SEM for Cryogenic electron tomography, and automated collection and data processing.
