= UN CEFACT TBG5 =

Financial services organisation under United Nations

UN/CEFACT TBG5 is the entity responsible for financial services under the United Nations Centre for Trade facilitation and Electronic Business, (UN/CEFACT) under the United Nations Economic Commission for Europe (UNECE).

As an International Trade & Business Processes Group (TBG), TBG5 is the working group specializing in the Finance Domain its mission is to enable end-to-end straight-through processing (End to End (E2E) Straight Through Processing (STP) of financial services data and to establish standards and requirements for the exchange of such data.

TBG5 delivers solutions and standards that lead to the simplification of international trade. With finance forming an integral and vital part of many trade transactions the group is widely consulted by the other industry vertical domains under the UN/CEFACT umbrella who are pursuing similar objectives.

TBG5 is positioned as the co-ordination point between pure Financial Services standardisation, which takes place under ISO Technical Committee 68, and that of the wider trade domains represented under UN/CEFACT. The key objective in this respect is to offer interoperability, and indeed in the longer term convergence, between standards and solutions offered by either of these bodies. TBG5 has become more corporate-oriented by broadening out its membership to attract other industry vertical groupings, making TBG5 the focal forum allowing banks, corporates and others to collaborate on standards issues.

Past standards created by TBG5 include such important items in everyday use such as the EDIFACT standards for the payment domain. UN/EDIFACT is the international EDI standard. The acronym stands for United Nations/Electronic Data Interchange For Administration, Commerce, and Transport. The work of maintenance and further development of these payment standards is done through TBG5. EDIFACT has been adopted as a global standard by the International Organization for Standardization (ISO) as ISO 9735.

Other standards created by TBG5 include CREMUL, DEBMUL, DIRDEB, FINCAN, FINSTA and PAYMUL.

== Working Groups of TBG5 ==
=== Corporate Reference Group ===
The Corporate Reference Group subcommittee of TBG5 has a membership of corporations which use TBG5 standards. The Corporate Reference Group (CRG) mission is to identify requirements of industry for new standards and required improvements of existing standards. A primary mission of the CRG includes standardisation of the EDIFACT messages relevant for the STP information exchange between corporates and banks to save costs for implementation and maintenance by precise and unambiguous definitions and publication of the EDIFACT subsets.

=== Maintenance Task Force ===
The Maintenance Task Force develops new standards and edits existing standards as industry requirements change or new requirements are identified.

== Services of TBG5 ==
TBG5 offers an online IBAN validation service. Additionally the source code for this service can be imported into other websites.

=== IBAN Validation Online Service ===
The TBG5 validation service will validate IBAN numbers in all current 46 countries that have adopted the IBAN (which is ISO Standard 13616) and is currently available in eight languages.

=== IBAN Validation Service Sourcecode ===
The TBG5 validation service source code is available for reuse on other websites.

== History of EDIFACT and UN CEFACT TBG5 ==
The cross-sectorial project which is now called UN CEFACT started in 1987 under a multitude of nicknames such as EDI, JEDI. Around 1988 UNECE formally sponsored the ISO recommendation aimed at achieving a universal common syntax and the acronym became EDIFACT (Electronic Data Exchange For Administration Commerce and Transport). The word transport was adopted over the originally proposed trade which – in Oxford English – is synonymous to commerce).

In 1989 the concept of EDIFACT, the cross-sectorial messaging destined to permit end-to-end STP communication between banks and their corporate customers, was introduced to the financial sector during the SWIFT SIBOS conference held in Stockholm through a joint corporate and bank panel presentation. Attendance at this session was overwhelming (remote television screens had to be installed outside the packed meeting room); however, incompatibility between EDIFACT and SWIFT syntax prevented any further progress until XML syntax enabled stakeholders in the standardisation process to resume contacts.

The EDIFACT organisation was initially based on separate, autonomous regions around the globe, i.e. Western Europe, the Americas and Australasia, with Eastern Europe being a non-voting participant. Each approval and amendment had to be accepted by the three regional communities, each officially represented by a distinct rapporteur. Frequent disputes had to be discussed and sorted out during the semi-annual meetings called JRT (Joint Rapporteur Team) meetings. With the advent of email the EDIFACT organisation was centralised, especially the technical assessment working group, and the regional rapporteurs’ role was eventually reduced to nothing. Over time the EDIFACT organization was constituted by UNECE under its current name UN CEFACT TBG5.
