= Electronic Banking Internet Communication Standard =

European financial transmission protocol

The Electronic Banking Internet Communication Standard (EBICS) is a European transmission protocol developed by the German Banking Industry Committee for sending payment information between banks, as well as between banks and client applications, over the Internet. It is mainly used in Germany, France, Austria, and Switzerland. It grew out of the earlier BCS-FTAM protocol that was developed in 1995, with the aim of being able to use Internet connections and TCP/IP. It is mandated for use by German banks and has also been adopted by France, Switzerland and Austria. Adoptions in different countries have resulted in specific operations being permitted by some banks while being disallowed by others.

EBICS is used in the Single Euro Payments Area: the standard can be used as the secure communication channel to initiate SEPA Direct Debits and SEPA Credit Transfers using the Internet. SEPA concentrates on standardisation of clearing protocols in the inter-bank networks. The SEPA-Clearing guidelines do not supplant any national clearing transmission protocols. Theoretically the national banking transmission standards could be prolonged for decades.

== History ==
In 2005, the German Zentraler Kreditausschuss (ZKA / Central Credit Committee) initiated a project to replace the national banking clearing system based on FTAM (short BCS-FTAM). The design goals were specifically set to create a transmission protocol that can be used by other countries as well.

On 1 January 2006, the new EBICS transmission protocol was included in the German DFÜ-Abkommen (EDI-Agreement – enacted first on 15 March 1995). Since 1 January 2008, all German banks must support the EBICS transmission protocol and support for BCS-FTAM ended on 31 December 2010.

On 14 November 2008, a cooperation with the French "Comité Français d’Organisation et de Normalisation Bancaire" (CFONB – standardisation office in the banking sector of France) was pronounced such that EBICS would be adopted for usage in France. On 5 May 2009, a joint committee was created to resolve a modified EBICS. On 12 February 2010, a common EBICS for Germany and France was published.

The Deutsche Bundesbank has adopted the EBICS transmission protocol on 28 January 2009 to accept clearing information to be routed to the SWIFTnet interbanking network. The Bundesbank will only accept SEPA statements via SWIFTnet FileAct or EBICS submissions.

Most changes on the common EBICS involved to embed the French ETEBAC-3 message types and ETEBAC-5 signature elements into the EBICS transmission format. Previously ETEBAC was transported via X.25 packet network lines (in Germany the BCS-FTAM protocol used ISDN direct lines). French Telecom closed its X.25 network in November 2011.

The Austrian banking sector began transitioning to the EBICS 3.0.2 protocol for commercial banking operations, replacing the current local MBS (Multi-Banking System) standard starting in November 2023. This migration includes the early adoption of the complementary signatures change request (CR-EB-22-05), following an anonymous vote by Austrian banks.

== Operations ==
The EBICS protocol is based on an IP network. It allows use of standard HTTP with TLS encryption (HTTPS) for transport of data elements. Routing data elements are encoded in XML and secured through signing and encryption using X.509 PKI certificates, which replaced the older RSA keys. Signing and encryption were optional until version 3.0, after which they became mandatory. The EBICS transmission protocol can be used to wrap SEPA-XML statements as they come forward.

The standard does include two major areas – for usage in the bank-client transmission including statements of account (MT940/STA) and for interbanking clearing.

== Standards ==
Certain operations remain consistent across different versions of the standards, while others have been removed or introduced in newer versions. Most banks provide support for multiple versions of the standard simultaneously.

- Ebics 2.4 (from November 2008)
- Ebics 2.5 (from July 2012)
- Ebics 3.0 (from November 2018)

== See also ==
- International Payments Framework
- ISO 20022
