= Europay International =

Former financial company

Europay International was a financial company. It was created by the merger of Eurocard International and Eurocheque International and was headquartered in Waterloo, Belgium, on the same premises as EPSS (European Payment Systems Services) and MasterCard EMEA (the MasterCard region comprising Europe, the Middle East and Africa). It merged with MasterCard International to form MasterCard, Inc in 2002. During its existence it was, along with Visa, one of the two credit card processors that dominated the European market. The EMV payment system, now a de facto standard for debit and credit cards, was named from Europay, MasterCard, and Visa, the three companies that proposed its usage.

== History ==
In 1993, Europay International SA and MasterCard International announced they would form a single transaction-processing network. In 1995, it partnered with IBM. In 2001, Europay International was headquartered in Waterloo, Belgium and owned by a number of European financial institutions, with Mastercard International owning a 12 percent share. Europay, along with Visa, dominated the European credit card market during its existence. By June 1994, it had issued 100 million cards, representing 56% of Europe's total market, although Visa still led in terms of dollar volume. Until 1994, it was the dominant credit card processor in German-speaking countries and Northern Europe, but after that it lost ground to Visa in the north but gained market share in the south of Europe. By 1996, Europay represented 71% of all European debit cards, and 56% of combined debit and credit cards.

In 2000, Europay International was an official sponsor of the Euro 2000 football competition, meaning that credit cards issued by participating banks could optionally carry the logo of the tournament.

After announcing the plan in June 2001, in 2002, Europay International merged with MasterCard International to form MasterCard, Inc. Today the combined company is known as MasterCard Worldwide.

In 2002, Europay International held a conference in Dublin, Ireland and noted "card fraud had increased as the use of cards had grown."

== Brands ==
Europay International was the owner of the following payment brands: Eurocard (charge card), Eurocheque (paper-based pan-European cheque system), ec travellers' cheque (paper-based European travelers' checks), and Clip (European e-purse based on Common Electronic Purse Specification). It also held the European licenses of MasterCard (credit card) and Maestro (online debit card, joint-venture with MasterCard International).
