= European Committee for Banking Standards =

The European Committee for Banking Standards (ECBS) was formed in December 1992 by leading European banking associations to enhance the European technical banking infrastructure by developing standards. In 2006 its functions were taken over by the European Payments Council and the committee was disbanded.

Its website is now maintained by an independent group the European Banking Resources.
