= Eurocheque =

Financial product

The Eurocheque was a type of cheque used in Europe that was accepted across national borders and which could be written in a variety of currencies.

Eurocheques were introduced in 1968 as an alternative to the traveller's cheque and for international payments for goods and services. They were rapidly adopted for domestic use in a number of countries, to the extent that their use for international payment rarely accounted for more than 5% of total Eurocheque transactions. The charges for clearing Eurocheques were substantially lower than those for cross-border use of domestic cheques.

Although still accepted as payment by a few bodies, the practice of issuing Eurocheques ceased on 1 January 2002, following the decision to withdraw the Eurocheque guarantee.

== Popularity ==
Originally, Eurocheques were particularly popular in German-speaking countries, where they were often issued as standard domestic cheques. They usually had to be accompanied by a cheque guarantee card in order to be accepted in payment at a point of sale. The Eurocheque guarantee card was enriched with a withdrawal function that could function across European borders in 1987 and payment function at merchants in 1989. It was the first time in history that a magnetic card could function across borders. A chip was then added in 1997, under the EMV standards (EMV stands for Europay, Mastercard, Visa). In some countries, such as Austria and Germany, virtually all Eurocheque cards were co-branded with the logo of the respective domestic debit card system and were actually debit cards. After the merger between eurocheque International and Eurocard International to create Europay International, virtually all of these Eurocheque cards were replaced by the Maestro brand, owned by Europay International Maestro cards. Therefore, Maestro is the direct successor to the Eurocheque system, with the eurocheque colors up until Mastercard (who took Europay International over in 2004) replaced them with the Mastercard "debit" card logo.

The decision to end the issuing of Eurocheques was taken because increasing numbers of retailers and banks started to decline payment by Eurocheque and because the use of cash machines and credit cards by international travellers grew within Europe. The relatively high cost of processing Eurocheques, together with the costs resulting from fraud, were also among the factors. In advance of the move, the European Commission expressed concern that "the benefits of the existing eurocheque system, in particular its standardised cheque format and its clearing facilities in all European countries should not be lost."

== History ==
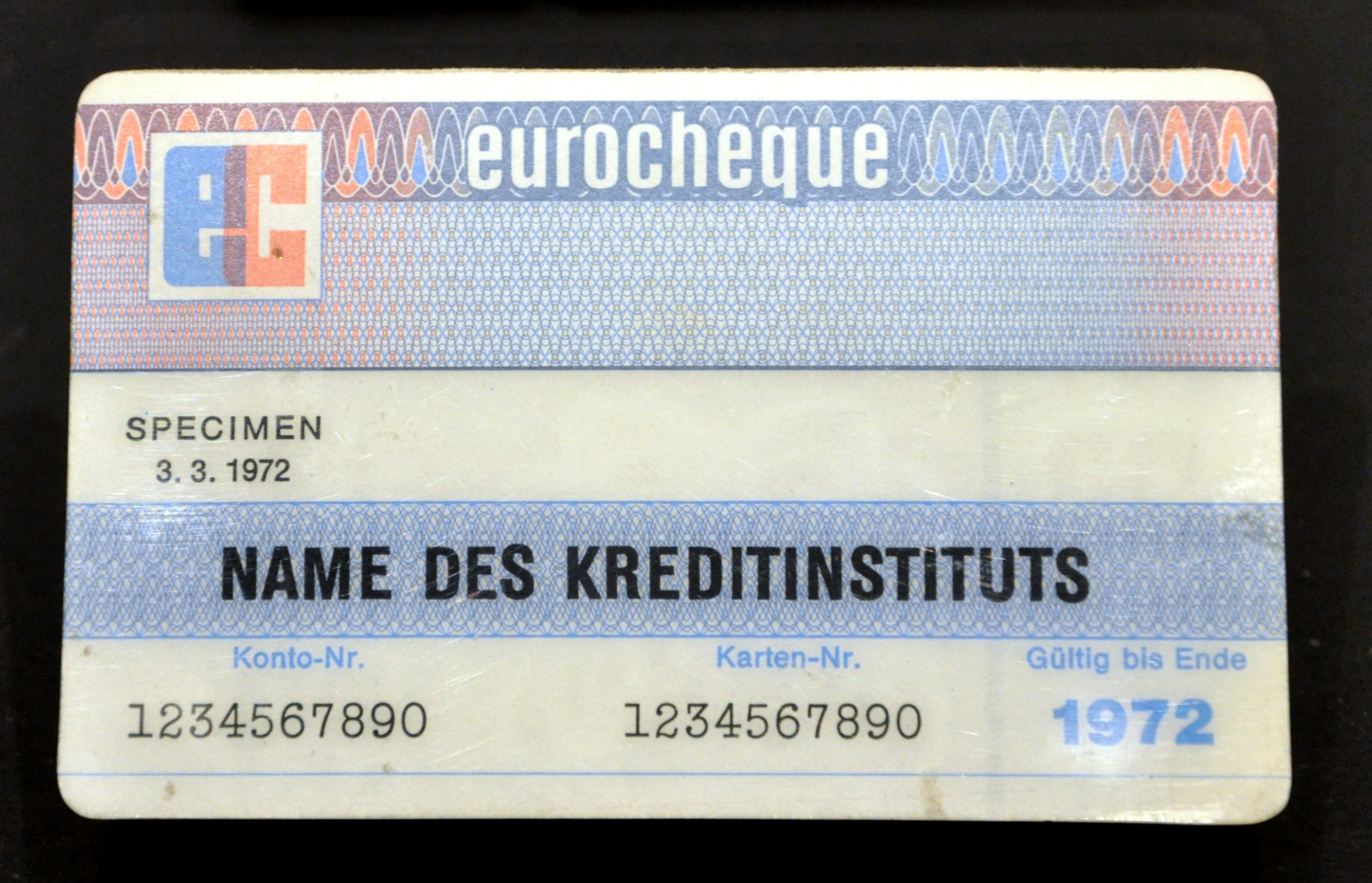
Eurocheque card

The Eurocheque was launched in 1969 with the participation of banks in 14 countries: Belgium, France, United Kingdom, the Netherlands, Austria, Switzerland and West Germany (which issued and accepted Eurocheques) together with Denmark, Italy, Ireland, Luxembourg, Norway, Spain and Sweden (which accepted Eurocheques).

In 1972, the 'uniform Eurocheque' and 'uniform Eurocheque guarantee card' were introduced, providing single designs that could be used by all banks within the system. Previously all Eurocheques had carried the Eurocheque symbol, but differed in their designs.

Eurocheque International C.V. was formed in 1974 to process payments made using Eurocheques.

In 1983, British banks withdrew the Eurocheque symbol from their credit cards.

On 3 February 1988, Eurocheque International became a cooperative society established under Belgian law, having previously been a de facto association, rather than a legal entity. The shareholders were the Association of Swedish Banks, Associazione Bancaria Italiana, Groupement des cartes bancaires 'CB' (France), Comunidade Portuguesa eurocheque, Bank of Cyprus, Caisse d'épargne de l'État du grand-duché de Luxembourg, Agrupació Andorrana Eurocheque, PBS-Pengeinstitutternes BetalingsSystemer (Denmark), Apacs (United Kingdom), Telekurs (Switzerland), Suomen Pankkiyhdistys (Finland), Association of Norwegian Banks, Stichting Bevordering Chequeverkeer (Netherlands), Irish Clearing House, Jugobanka (Yugoslavia), Association of Austrian Banks and Bankers, Eurocheque Belgique sc, GZS-Gesellschaft für Zahlungssysteme GmbH (Germany).

According to an estimate by Eurocheque International, in 1989 around 32 million Eurocheque cards had been issued by some 9,000 banks in 20 countries.

By the end of 1998, there were 46 participating countries, 22 of them both issuing and accepting the cheques: Belgium, Denmark, Germany, Finland, France, United Kingdom, Ireland, Israel, Italy, Croatia, Luxembourg, Malta, Netherlands, Poland, Portugal, Switzerland, Slovenia, Spain, the Czech Republic, Hungary, Cyprus, and 24 accepting cheques: Egypt, Albania, Algeria, Andorra, Armenia, Azerbaijan, Bosnia-Herzegovina, Bulgaria, Georgia, Gibraltar, Greece, Iceland, Lebanon, Lithuania, Latvia, Morocco, Macedonia, Romania, Russia, Slovakia, Tunisia, Turkey, Ukraine, Belarus, accounting all together for more than 350 million customers and 5 million merchants across the whole of Europe.

In 1989, French banks signed the "Helsinki Agreement" with eurocheque International, allowing all French CB cards to be accepted in the eurocheque network across Europe and all eurocheque products (cheque and debit card) to be accepted in France. In the same year, the use of the Uniform Eurocheque format became universal.

In 1991, Eurocheque International and Eurocard International announced the creation of a 50/50 joint venture under the name "Europay International".

On 1 September 1992, Eurocheque International C.V. merged with Eurocard International N.V. into a single company, Europay International S.A., incorporated under Belgian law. Europay relocated to Waterloo, Belgium, where they shared the same address as the Europe, Middle East and Africa region of MasterCard International. Mastercard had a 15% share in Europay International.

In June 2001, eurocheques no longer benefited from a bank guarantee. In October 2001, new chequebooks were no longer distributed to customers.

Europay International was sold to Mastercard International in 2004, bringing a definitive end to European sovereignty in payments.

== See also ==
- Substitute check
