= Eurocard (credit card) =

Credit card

Eurocard was a credit card, introduced in 1964 by Marcus Wallenberg Jr. of the Wallenberg family as an alternative to American Express. In 1968, it signed a deal with the Interbank Card Association (today's MasterCard) so that their cards were accepted by each other's networks; this eventually led to a joint venture known as Maestro International in 1992, and merger in 2002.

Its operations were relocated to Belgium in the end of the 1960s, and the card became the dominant brand in North and Central Europe between 1970 and 2002. It was eventually replaced by the Mastercard brand in most locations, but its logo is still used in some countries.

== History ==
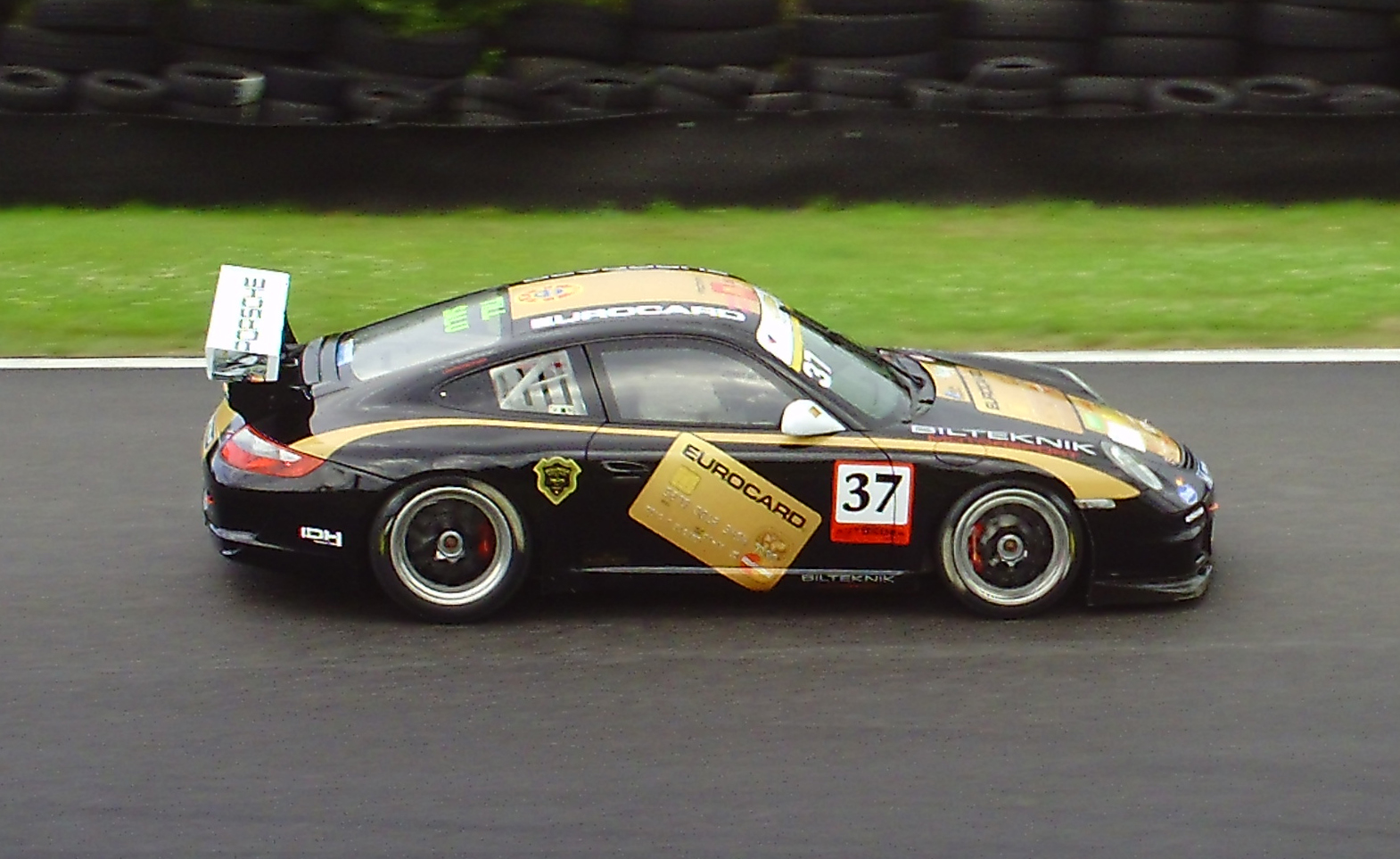
Porsche 997 GT3 Cup with Eurocard sponsoring driven by Peter "Poker" Wallenberg and Daniel Haglöf for Bilteknik Motorsport in Swedish GT Series at Falkenbergs Motorbana (July 2011)

In 1965, Eurocard International N.V. was established, based in Brussels, as a not-for-profit membership association of European banks. Its operational entity was established as European Payment System Services (EPSS). In 1968, Eurocard International and the Interbank Card Association entered into a strategic alliance, in which both issuer's cards would be accepted on either network.

This allowed the ICA to get an instant European acceptance network, and Eurocard to get accepted worldwide. Eurocard International got the sole license to issue the ICA's Master Charge (later MasterCard) cards in Europe.

In 1992, Eurocard International N.V., Eurocheque International C.V. and Eurocheque International Holding N.V. merged into a single company, Europay International S.A., and were relocated to Waterloo, Belgium. This location also housed the Europe, Middle East and Africa region of MasterCard International, and the seat of the joint venture of Eurocard MasterCard, Maestro International.

In 2002, Europay International and MasterCard International merged. The name Europay disappeared, and the new organisation was later renamed MasterCard Worldwide, with the headquarters in Waterloo renamed MasterCard Europe. In 2008, Eurocard was taken over by the Swedish Skandinaviska Enskilda Banken. Eurocard has always been the dominant brand in Central European countries, more specifically in Germany, the Netherlands and Austria.

It lagged behind Visa in southern European countries, such as Spain and France.

== Acceptance mark ==
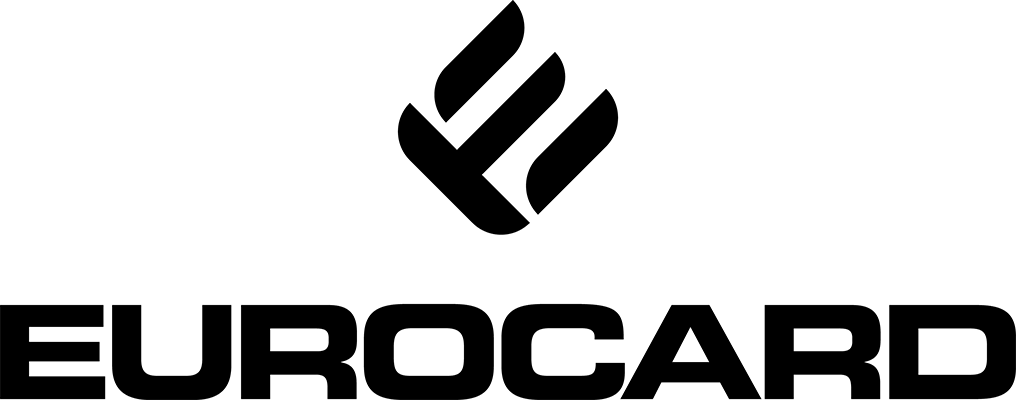

Today, the Eurocard name exists in combination with the MasterCard acceptance mark as a product name. This means that the Eurocard name is still used on a card, although only the MasterCard logo is displayed at locations which accept MasterCard cards. The Eurocard logo is not used any more, as the acceptance mark is discontinued and merged into MasterCard.

However, the use of Eurocard as a brand for MasterCard credit cards is limited to Scandinavian countries and the Baltic countries. In other former Eurocard markets, such as the German speaking countries, this brand was fully replaced by the MasterCard brand.
