= Paytm Payments Bank =

Indian payments bank

- Type: Private company
- Industry: Financial services, Banking
- Founded: 28 November 2017
- Founder: Vijay Shekhar Sharma
- Defunct: 24 April 2026
- Fate: Closed (2026)
- Headquarters: Noida, Uttar Pradesh, India
- Area served: India
- Key people: Arun Kumar Bansal (CEO)
- Products: Banking, Savings Account, Retail Banking, Online Banking
- Owners: Vijay Shekhar Sharma (51%); One97 Communications (49%)
- Website: www.paytm.bank.in

Paytm Payments Bank (PPBL) was an Indian payments bank, founded in 2017 and headquartered in Noida. In the same year, it received the license to run a payments bank from the Reserve Bank of India and was launched in November 2017. In 2021, the bank received a scheduled bank status from the RBI.

Vijay Shekhar Sharma holds 51 percent in the entity with One97 Communications holding 49 percent. Vijay Shekhar Sharma is the promoter of Paytm Payments Bank, and One97 Communications Limited is not categorized as one of its promoters. He resigned as part-time non-executive chairman and board member of Paytm Payments Bank, citing regulatory challenges with the Reserve Bank of India.

On 31 January 2024, Paytm Payments Bank was stopped from onboarding new customers onto their platform, due to persistent non-compliance and continued material supervisory concerns within the bank. It was also told to not accept deposits or credit transactions or top ups shall be allowed in any customer accounts, prepaid instruments, wallets, FASTags, NCMC cards after 15 March 2025. The Reserve Bank of India took this step under Section 35A of the Banking Regulation Act, 1949. According to the RBI, this decision aimed to address certain irregularities in Paytm Payments Bank's banking services, ensuring compliance with regulatory norms.

On 24 April 2026, the RBI canceled the banking license of PayTM Payments Bank, citing non compliance with several sections of the Banking Regulation Act, 1949, effective from close of business on the same day.

== History ==
In 2015, Paytm Payments Bank Limited received in-principle approval from the Reserve Bank of India to set up a payments bank and was formally inaugurated on November 28, 2017.

In the financial year 2020, the bank facilitated more than 485 crore transactions worth ₹4.6 lakh crore. It processed over 778 million UPI transactions amounting to ₹89,388 crore in June 2022 and continues to be India's biggest UPI beneficiary bank, with over 1,370 million digital transactions in June 2022.

In March 2021, the bank received approval from the Securities and Exchange Board of India for issuing payment mandates for initial public offerings (IPOs) through its "@paytm" UPI handle.

After the RBI banned it from accepting deposits from 15 March 2024, it had to quickly migrate the handle to another company with a valid banking license. The handle was transferred to Yes Bank one day before the deadline to ensure existing users and merchants did not face any issues with their UPI transactions and AutoPay mandates.

== Products and services ==
Paytm Payments Bank offers savings and current accounts with a debit card, facilitating fast and easy payments. Paytm Payments Bank issued seven million Visa debit cards through its platform in FY 2021.

== Partnership ==
In January 2018, Paytm Payments Bank partnered with IndusInd Bank to offer fixed deposits. It entered into a partnership with MasterCard for the issuance of virtual and physical debit cards in April 2020. In January 2021, it tied up with Suryoday Small Finance Bank to offer fixed deposit services to its account holders. Since June 2021, it is not providing new fixed deposit creation with Suryodaya Bank.

== Financials ==
Paytm Payments Bank reported a ₹19 crore profit for the financial year 2018–2019, making it the first payments bank in India to become profitable. The company registered a profit of ₹29.8 crore for the financial year 2020.

== Regulatory issues ==
In June 2018, the Reserve Bank of India barred Paytm Payment Bank from opening new customer accounts, following an audit by the Reserve Bank of India, which made some observations about the process the company follows in acquiring new customers and its adherence to KYC norms. However, in January 2019, it received approval from the RBI to resume on-boarding new customers. In October 2021, RBI imposed a fine of ₹1 crore on the bank for violating laws pertaining to payments and settlement. On 11 March 2022, RBI prohibited PPBL from onboarding new customers owing to "certain material supervisory concerns observed in the bank".

In continuation of these actions, and after the validation report of the external auditors revealed persistent non-compliance and continued material supervisory concerns in the bank, RBI ordered the bank to stop onboarding customers and not to accept deposits engaging in credit transactions, or making top-ups in customers accounts after 29 February 2024. The prohibition order also includes not accepting additional deposits in prepaid instruments, wallets, FASTags, or National Common Mobility Cards.

The deadline was extended to 15 March 2024 by a press release a week later.

On 24 April 2026, the RBI cancelled the banking licence of Paytm Payments Bank under Section 22(4) of the Banking Regulation Act, 1949 to carry on the banking business in the country with effect from close of business. The regulator cited continued breaches of licensing conditions including activities done in a manner prejudicial to the interests of the bank and its depositors. The RBI said that it would move the High Court for starting the winding-up process of the bank. It confirmed that Paytm Payments Bank has adequate liquidity to pay all depositors in full during the winding up. This is the second time the bank has faced regulatory restrictions for breaches relating to customer due-diligence and KYC in 2022 and January 2024.

== See also ==
- Airtel Payments Bank
- Jio Payments Bank
- India Post Payments Bank
- Aditya Birla Payments Bank
