= National Common Mobility Card =

Public transit smart card used in India

- Location: India
- Launched: 4 March 2019; 7 years ago
- Technology: Contactless smart card; EMV
- Operator: National Payments Corporation of India (NPCI)
- Manager: Ministry of Housing and Urban Affairs (MoHUA)
- Currency: INR
- Validity: Some public transport systems; Toll roads; ATMs; RuPay points of sale
- Variants: Prepaid card; RuPay debit card; RuPay credit card
- Website: mohua.gov.in

National Common Mobility Card (NCMC) is a contactless smart card conceived by the Ministry of Housing and Urban Affairs under Prime Minister Narendra Modi's ‘One Nation, One Card' vision. It was launched on 4 March 2019. The transit card enables the user to pay for travel, tolls, retail shopping and withdraw money.

It is enabled through the RuPay card mechanism. The NCMC card is issuable as a prepaid, debit, or credit RuPay card from partnered banks such as the State Bank of India, Canara Bank, Bank of India, Punjab National Bank, and others.

== History ==
In late 2010, the Government of India envisioned a scheme wherein seamless access could be granted to public transport networks. The system, which later came to be known as Interoperable Fare Management System (IFMS), aimed to let passengers pay across different public transport platforms using one system. This was created as an effort to bring together the public transport system of the country under one umbrella. By making it accessible to every individual in every city, the government aimed to increase ease of access for public transport. The project is also structured in such a way so as to include customers across a wide variety of socioeconomic strata. An additional focus was also put on reducing the transaction time to the minimum, so as to make the payment experience as seamless as possible. It is also structured in such a way so as to reduce the financial risk to the stakeholders involved in the effort. It is designated as an EMV-based Open Loop Payments system.

The NCMC is indigenously developed and is part of Make In India project. It was first conceptualized in 2006 as part of the National Urban Transport Policy (NUTP). A previous attempt to develop a similar national mobility card led to the development of the More Card. Given its lack of seamless functioning across the nation, Venkaiah Naidu, the then Minister of Urban Development, set up a committee to recommend a card which is inter-operable across different transport systems in the country.

The urban development ministry brought in the National Payments Corporation of India (NPCI) with the task of management, clearing and settlement of payments, simulating cards and terminals and maintenance of network. Bharat Electronics Limited (BEL) has created the reader prototype.

On 8 April 2019, The Economic Times reported that Visa was seeking to issue National Common Mobility Cards. Visa announced that it had launched specifications to support the NCMC on 13 May 2019. Visa is ready with the specifications to start issuing cards on the NCMC network and has started discussions with banks to issue their cards on NCMC as well, but it will take some time for the cards to start getting rolled out in the market. Mastercard stated on 22 May 2019 that 15 Indian banks were at "various stages of signing up" for its NCMC. Mastercard is all set to join the National Common Mobility Card (NCMC) scheme, just weeks after its biggest competitor Visa said it planned to enter the programme as per Vikas Varma, senior vice-president, account management for South Asia at Mastercard.

== Technical details ==
The NCMC terminal works in a contactless manner using Near Field Communication (NFC). It is an open-loop system i.e. it works with compatible cards from any bank or issuer and does not need a user to buy a specific card. The transaction is fully offline i.e. the terminal does not communicate with bank servers to fetch the balance nor is the PIN required.

Normally, a debit/ATM card with a chip is usable at ATMs or Pos Machines by inserting it into the machine and entering the PIN. Recent versions of such cards support contactless transactions using NFC. This method allows transactions up to a certain limit (usually ₹5000 in India) without entering the PIN and up to the same limit as insert-chip method after entering the PIN. This process is online and is initiated by the machine the card is put near to, i.e., the machine communicates with the bank server to fetch the balance and the amount is deducted from the bank account.

The official contactless indicator from RuPay, used to indicate contactless capability on a contactless payment device using Near Field Communication (NFC).

Recent versions of such cards have an offline wallet feature as well which leverages NFC to make transactions fully offline without the need of PIN. The transaction limit is lower usually ₹200 per transaction and the wallet can store up to ₹2000. The wallet can be recharged by regular banking channels (Debit Card/Credit Card/ Net Banking), Bharat Bill Payment System or approaching the public transport counter with cash. It can also be topped up using the same card's chip feature which will deduct the amount from the same card's linked bank account. After the transfer is done, the offline wallet needs to perform Balance Update transaction to sync the balance. This is a one time activity and can be done at the designated Transport Operator/Terminal.

This means that the same card can be used at:

- ATMs with insert method which will debit the money from the linked bank account.
- IF NFC transactions are enabled on the card:
  - PoS machines in shops, banks, cafes without PIN for smaller transactions, and with PIN for larger transactions.
  - IF the user has activated the offline wallet for the card, has done the card topup and has performed the balance update transaction:
    - Metro gates, public transport buses, parking, etc., without PIN for small transactions.

Since enabling NFC for offline NCMC wallet also enabled NFC for online PoS machines, there is a risk of unauthorized transaction on a stolen card. Thus the limit of online NFC transactions should be kept low to prevent transactions without PIN. And the card should be blocked promptly. However, the amount on a stolen NCMC wallet cannot be blocked since the transaction is fully offline.

On 1 August 2024, RBL Bank announced integration of National Common Mobility Card and UPI capabilities with RuPay credit cards.

=== Recharging methods ===
(Note: This section describes recharge channels in general terms only. The National Common Mobility Card ecosystem spans dozens of issuing banks and transit operators, each with its own app, minimum/maximum top-up limits, and processing time, so exact steps are not enumerated here in keeping with Wikipedia's guideline that articles should not serve as instruction manuals (Wikipedia:What Wikipedia is not § Wikipedia is not a manual, guidebook, textbook, or scientific journal). Readers should consult their card-issuing bank's app or website, or the relevant transit operator's official recharge page, for system-specific instructions.) An NCMC's stored value (the "Transit Wallet" or offline wallet) can generally be topped up through several channels, which vary by issuing bank and by the transit operator's own infrastructure:

- Bank and UPI apps — most issuing banks (SBI, Airtel Payments Bank, RBL Bank, Axis Bank, Paytm Payments Bank, and others) allow recharge through their own mobile banking app or net banking portal, typically via UPI, debit card, credit card, or IMPS/NEFT.
- Bharat Bill Payment System (BBPS) — NCMC recharge is listed as a biller category on BBPS-integrated apps (including bank apps and third-party UPI apps), allowing top-up up to a bank-specific limit (₹10,000 for the SBI/NPCI BBPS integration) without needing the issuing bank's own app.
- Third-party payment apps — several NCMC and transit-specific smart cards can also be recharged through consumer apps such as Paytm, PhonePe, Amazon Pay, and, on some systems, WhatsApp-based recharge bots.
- Station/depot counters and machines — cash, card, or UPI recharge is generally available at transit operator ticket counters, Ticket Vending Machines (TVMs), or dedicated Recharge Card Machines (RCMs), which some operators (e.g. Ahmedabad Metro) treat as a separate machine from the TVM used to buy single-journey tickets.
- In-app or in-card chip top-up — on debit/credit-card variants of the NCMC, some banks allow the card's own linked bank account to top up its offline transit wallet directly via the chip, without a separate recharge transaction.

After any online or remote top-up, most systems require the cardholder to tap the card at a station reader or designated "Balance Update" terminal to sync the new balance into the card's offline wallet before it can be spent — since, as noted above, the fare-gate transaction itself is fully offline and cannot read a bank server's balance directly.

== Implementation ==
Mumbai Railway Vikas Corporation (MRVC) is planning to implement the ambitious scheme in Mumbai suburban railway network in a step towards an integrated ticketing system (ITS).

In certain cities such as Bengaluru and Chennai, adoption of NCMC by users of transport systems was slow due to a lack of integration across different modes of transport and parking payments. At the end of 2022, Kolkata had still not seen NCMC deployment in any of its transport modes, and this remained the case as of September 2025: Metro Railway Kolkata, the Indian Railways division that runs the Kolkata Metro, extended the validity of its own closed-loop smart card from one to ten years that month rather than migrating to NCMC, and continues to sell only tokens and its proprietary smart card at stations.

Rajya Sabha was informed on 4 December 2023 that Delhi Metro Rail Corporation (DMRC) will introduce Open Loop National Common Mobility Cards (NCMC) in a phased manner which will replace the current Closed Loop Delhi Metro Smart Cards. In July 2023, Government of India directed banks to issue NCMC-compliant cards by default to customers.

On January 2, 2024, Bank of Baroda announced the introduction of the NCMC RuPay Reloadable Prepaid Card. On February 5, 2024, Federal Bank introduced dual-interface RuPay Debit cards with NCMC integration. For NCMC usage, the maximum top-up limit for the card balance is ₹2,000.

Bengaluru Metro Rail Corporation intends to gradually replace its closed-loop contactless smartcards with the National Common Mobility Card. PM Modi symbolically inaugurated NCMC acceptance on Namma Metro on 25 March 2023, at the opening of the Whitefield (Kadugodi) extension, with issuance to the general public via RBL Bank beginning 30 March 2023 — a rollout that had already been delayed relative to Delhi, Mumbai and Kochi. Due to the easing of the RBI KYC mandate, AGS Transact Technologies, which is in charge of implementing the NCMC project in Bengaluru, anticipates that the backend process will be prepared for the rollout of NCMCs without KYC verification by the first week of March 2024.

The NCMC and FASTag will be incorporated into the e-mandate framework by the RBI from June 2024 to facilitate and ease the process for users to top off their accounts.

The NCMC service is about to be introduced in Himachal Pradesh. The State Bank of India (SBI) and the Himachal Road Transport Corporation (HRTC) will work together to launch this service on September 5, 2024. Passengers will be able to use the NCMC card to pay for fare on HRTC buses as well as metro services in places like Bengaluru and Delhi. From August 16, 2024, Srinagar Smart City Limited (SSCL) will offer NCMC service with five percent reduction on the base passenger fare to promote cashless travel. The Chalo App will help users recharge the card balance. A parallel programme under the PM e-Bus Sewa Scheme has since extended a comparable e-bus fleet, operated by Jammu Smart City Limited (JSCL), to Jammu; a Letter of Intent has been issued to Chalo Mobility Private Limited to build an NCMC-compliant digital ticketing solution across both cities' fleets, though live NCMC acceptance on the Jammu fleet had not been confirmed as of September 2026.

In July 2025, Mahametro floated a ₹154.30 crore tender to convert its closed loop Maha Card based fare collection system at Nagpur Metro into an open loop system compatible with NCMC services countrywide. The tender, covering an EMV NCMC and QR-code based Automatic Fare Collection system with an accompanying comprehensive annual maintenance contract for Nagpur Metro Phase 2, drew three bidders by late 2025, with the contract to be awarded to the lowest bidder; award of the contract remained pending as of September 2026.

Separately, Madhya Pradesh Metro Rail Corporation Limited (MPMRCL) invited tenders in May 2026 to select a financial institution to issue open-loop NCMC cards and provide transaction-acquiring and AFC-integration services for its Bhopal and Indore Metro networks, both of which had already begun partial passenger operations.

On 1 April 2026, the Maharashtra State Road Transport Corporation (MSRTC) launched an Aadhaar-linked, RuPay On-the-Go NCMC-enabled smart card, initially targeted at concession-category passengers such as students, senior citizens, women and persons with disabilities, with registration and distribution rolled out across MSRTC depots and bus stations statewide. Adoption accelerated through mid-2026: an ₹140 crore contract awarded to Ebix Technologies covers distribution of over 2 crore cards through a 3,000-outlet retail network, making it India's first statewide NCMC rollout, and the card became mandatory (rather than merely available) for all passengers claiming statutory travel concessions, with the compliance deadline pushed from 1 August to 1 September 2026. By August 2026, district-level registration figures in the tens of thousands were being reported from individual depots (e.g. over 71,000 in Chandrapur district, over 33,000 in Bhandara district), with women concession-holders under the state's Mahila Samman Yojana forming the largest share of registrants.

=== Bharat Bill Payment System integration ===
The National Common Mobility Card has been integrated into the Bharat Bill Payment System (BBPS) through a partnership between NPCI and SBI. The SBI NCMC for Noida Metro, Nagpur Metro, MMRDA Line 2A and Line 7, Chennai Metro, Kanpur Metro, and Parliament Canteen is operational on BBPS. Customers can top up their cards with up to ₹10,000 online with the addition of NCMC Recharge in the biller category. To update the balance after the recharge, users need to tap their NCMC on the terminal.

=== NCMC Smartwatch ===
At the Global Fintech Fest 2024, Airtel Payments Bank, in collaboration with Noise and the NPCI, launched a smartwatch that incorporates RuPay chip embedded in the dial, enabling direct payments. Tap-and-pay transactions are made easier by the smartwatch's support for National Common Mobility Card technology. Users can pay at a variety of retail sites and public transportation hubs, including as bus stops, metro stations, and parking lots. Users may choose between contactless purchases and monthly passes on the device, as well as handle transportation concessions. A PIN is required to conduct transactions over ₹5,000, whereas transactions under this amount can be performed without one. According to the revised RBI guidelines, Ongo Ride prepaid card does not require complete KYC in order to make transit payments.

=== Offline support ===
In order to provide a smooth, offline payment option for all NCMC-enabled transit projects, such as metro rails, buses, ferries, tolls, and parking throughout India, the State Bank of India released the MTS RuPay NCMC prepaid card on August 30, 2024. Travelers can now easily make payments, even in places with spotty internet access.

=== Concerns ===
In Guwahati, the NCMC was introduced on January 1, 2024. However, before the card can be made publicly available, there are issues with its rollout that need to be resolved. Initially it is available at limited locations such as the Assam State Transport Corporation (ASTC) counter at Paltan Bazar, ASTC counter at the Inter State Bus Terminal, the Rupnagar ASTC Yard, and the ASTC Kiosk at Lokpriya Gopinath Bordoloi International Airport. Essential documents like an Aadhaar, an Aadhaar-linked phone number, and an OTP verification are also needed for the card's issuance as part of the Know Your Customer (KYC) requirement.

Due to poor adoption rate, the Reserve Bank of India (RBI) removed KYC requirement for NCMC with a ₹3,000 limit as of February 23, 2024. This should make it possible for more of these cards to be issued and used.

== Acceptance ==
System is actively piloting, upgrading, or tendering for full NCMC acceptance
System does not currently accept the NCMC and has no publicly confirmed pilot or rollout under way

According to Mumbai Metro, as of December 14, 2023, all fare collection gates on the stations along the Line 1, Line 2, and Line 7 have been upgraded to be NCMC compliant.

Commencing in June 2024, commuters of Chennai Metro and other NCMC holders are also able to pay for and ride on Metropolitan Transport Corporation (MTC) buses. According to the Chennai Unified Metropolitan Transport Authority, discussions are already taking place with the Southern Railway zone authorities on implementing the NCMC in trains as well in the near future.

Ongo, the digital payments platform of AGS Transact Technologies, has introduced an instant National Common Mobility Card 'Ongo Ride' in conjunction with the Chennai Metro Rail Limited (CMRL) on 14 August 2024. At 12 CMRL metro stations in Chennai, Ongo has installed special card dispensers with the Unified Payments Interface (UPI) feature to enable these ready-to-use Ongo Ride cards. By integrating payments at parking lots and toll booths with multiple modes of transportation, such as metros, buses, and water ferries, Ongo Ride provides commuters with a single, integrated payment solution.

By September 2026, the number of Indian cities where NCMC could be used for both metro rail and city bus travel on a single card had grown to include Delhi, Chennai, Mumbai and Bengaluru — Mumbai's Metro Lines 1, 2A, 3 and 7 and BEST buses all accept the same card, and Bengaluru added NCMC acceptance on its city bus network in 2026.

The tables below organise every identified Indian public transport system by level of governance and operation — Urban & Suburban (city-run metro rail, metropolitan bus systems, monorail, tram, ropeway, and water metro/ferry networks, together with suburban rail services, since these function as part of a single metropolitan region's transport network rather than as national services), Regional (multi-district, interstate, or union-territory-wide systems — chiefly inland and inter-island water transport, and interstate rapid-rail corridors such as NCRTC's Namo Bharat — that are not confined to a single urban area and are not road-based State Road Transport Corporation networks), Statewide (State Road Transport Corporation bus networks and equivalent state undertakings), and National (long-distance services operated by Indian Railways or by other central-government rail undertakings) — noting which currently accept the NCMC, which are actively piloting, upgrading or tendering towards acceptance (highlighted in yellow), and which do not accept it at all and have no publicly confirmed pilot under way (highlighted in red). Only systems that are operational or under construction are listed; systems still at the planning, approval, or proposal stage are excluded. This is not an exhaustive account of every fare-collection system in the country — in particular, several smaller state and union-territory road transport undertakings are not individually listed, for the reasons set out in the note at the head of § Statewide systems — and editors should verify current status against operator announcements and the NPCI RuPay On-the-Go live members list before relying on it.

=== Urban & Suburban systems ===
City-run metro rail, metropolitan bus, monorail, tram, ropeway, and water metro/ferry networks, and suburban rail services (which, though sometimes operated by Indian Railways zones, function as part of a single city's urban transport network rather than as national or interstate services). Interstate/regional rapid transit corridors are listed separately under § Regional systems.

State / UT	City	Operator	System	Acceptance	Other Payment/Ticketing Modes	Card Name	Issuing Bank	Commissioned	Comments
Bihar	Patna	Patna Metro Rail Corporation, with Delhi Metro Rail Corporation as a consultant.	Patna Metro System	Partial (priority section only)	Cash, QR-coded paper tokens, and (on most systems) the operator's own closed-loop stored-value smart card.; Several systems also support UPI/QR-based ticketing at gates.	N.A.	N.A.	6 October 2025	NCMC acceptance is confirmed only on the operational priority section; the full network remains under construction, so this row was recategorised from "Complete Network" to "Partial" — a dedicated card name/issuing bank partnership specific to Patna Metro was not found.
Delhi	Delhi National Capital Region	Delhi Metro Rail Corporation	Delhi Metro System	Complete Network	Cash or UPI paid at counters/TVMs for reusable tokens.; Digital QR e-tickets via the DMRC app and third-party apps (Amazon Pay, Paytm, WhatsApp).; Closed-loop smart card.; NCMC.	Paytm Transit Card	Paytm	28 December 2020	All stations retrofitted with NCMC readers.
Delhi	Delhi National Capital Region	Delhi Transport Corporation	Delhi Bus System	Complete Network	Cash, and UPI/card payments via electronic ticketing machines (ETMs).; Some corporations also offer WhatsApp-based ticketing.	Pink Saheli Card	N.A.	March 2026	The article previously described NCMC-compatible ETM procurement as merely "underway." The Delhi government's Pink Saheli card — an NCMC-enabled card required for women availing free DTC/cluster bus travel — went live in March 2026 and became mandatory for concession travel from August 2026.
Delhi	Delhi National Capital Region	Northern Railway	Delhi Suburban Railway (Ring Railway)	N.A.	Cash and paper tickets at counters/machines, plus QR-code tickets via Indian Railways' UTS mobile app.; Monthly/seasonal passes.	N.A.	N.A.	N.A.	previously entirely absent from this article despite being a distinct Indian Railways suburban service from Delhi Metro. Opened 1 October 1975 as Delhi's Ring Railway, with 21–46 stations depending on source and roughly 35–320 km of route reported across different figures; conventional Indian Railways ticketing only, not NCMC-integrated.
Gujarat	Ahmedabad	Ahmedabad Janmarg Limited	Ahmedabad Bus Rapid Transit System	Complete Network	Cash, QR-coded paper tickets, and the system's own closed-loop smart card/E-purse.; UPI accepted at some counters.	Janmitra card	ICICI Bank		
Gujarat	Ahmedabad	Gujarat Metro Rail Corporation Limited	Ahmedabad Metro System	Complete Network	Cash/UPI/card paid at ticket windows or TVMs for QR-coded paper tickets (the ticket itself serves as the receipt).; Tokens and the closed-loop CSC smart card remain valid only within the original Phase 1 stations, not on the Phase 2 extension.; GMRC app QR tickets.; NCMC (10% discount).	Airtel Rupay NCMC Card	Airtel Payments Bank	4 March 2019	
Gujarat	Ahmedabad	Ahmedabad Municipal Transport Service	Ahmedabad Bus System	Complete Network	Cash, QR-coded paper tickets, and the system's own closed-loop smart card/E-purse.; UPI accepted at some counters.	Airtel Rupay NCMC Card	Airtel Payments Bank		An "exclusive" NCMC project — only AMTS-issued NCMCs are accepted on the system, though AMTS-issued cards work on other non-exclusive NCMC networks.
Gujarat	Rajkot	Rajkot Municipal Transport Service	Rajkot Bus System; Rajkot Bus Rapid Transit System	N.A.	Cash, with UPI/QR-code payments via ETMs where digitised.	N.A.	N.A.	N.A.	Remains operational as of 2026 (one of the small number of Indian BRTS corridors, alongside Ahmedabad, Surat, and Hubballi-Dharwad, that have not been dismantled); no NCMC acceptance announced.
Gujarat	Surat	Sitilink (Surat Municipal Transport Service)	Surat Bus System; Surat Bus Rapid Transit System	Complete Network	Cash, QR-coded paper tickets, and the system's own closed-loop smart card/E-purse.; UPI accepted at some counters.				An "exclusive" NCMC project, alongside Noida Metro, Kochi Metro, Pune Metro, Nagpur Metro and Ahmedabad's Janmarg and AMTS systems.
Gujarat	Surat	Gujarat Metro Rail Corporation Limited	Surat Metro	N.A.	Cash, QR-coded paper tokens, and (on most systems) the operator's own closed-loop stored-value smart card.; Several systems also support UPI/QR-based ticketing at gates.	N.A.	N.A.	N.A.	Under construction; initial section in trial runs, full network expected by 2027. Distinct from Surat's Sitilink BRTS (listed above), which already accepts NCMC; no active Metro rollout or tender confirmed as of September 2026.
Haryana	Gurugram (Delhi National Capital Region)	Rapid Metro Rail Gurgaon Limited (RMGL); operations and maintenance taken over by Delhi Metro Rail Corporation on 22 October 2019, now jointly managed with the newly formed Gurugram Metro Rail Limited (GMRL) pending full transition	Rapid Metro Gurgaon	N.A.	Ticket counters and vending machines; historically integrated fare structure with Delhi Metro, so that Delhi Metro Smart Card holders could use Rapid Metro directly.	N.A.	N.A.	14 November 2013 (line); 22 October 2019 (DMRC takeover)	A real, operational 12.85 km light metro (interchanges with Delhi Metro's Yellow Line at Sikanderpur), directly operated by DMRC since 22 October 2019 and transitioning to Gurugram Metro Rail Limited (GMRL) as of a May 2026 HMRTC board meeting. Marked yellow, riding DMRC's own active NCMC rollout, pending direct confirmation of readers at these stations. A separate new Gurugram Metro corridor (Bhoomi Pujan performed September 2025) is under construction and not given its own row here.
Haryana	Gurugram (Delhi National Capital Region)	Gurugram Metropolitan City Bus Limited (GMCBL)	Gurugram Bus System	N.A.	Cash and the system's own closed-loop Gurugaman smart card.; UPI via the Gurugaman app.	N.A.	N.A.	N.A.	Uses its own closed-loop Gurugaman smart card; NCMC-based unified ticketing has been proposed in GMDA's Comprehensive Mobility Plan but not implemented as of September 2026.
Jammu and Kashmir	Srinagar	Srinagar Smart City Limited	Srinagar Bus System	Complete Network	Cash, with UPI/QR-code payments via ETMs where digitised.			16 August 2024	Five percent fare discount for NCMC users; recharge via the Chalo App.
Jammu and Kashmir	Jammu	Jammu Smart City Limited	Jammu Bus System	N.A.	Cash; FASTag-based toll payment on intercity e-bus routes (Udhampur, Katra).	N.A.	N.A.	N.A.	Operated under the PM e-Bus Sewa Scheme, the direct counterpart to Srinagar Smart City Limited above. A Letter of Intent has been issued to Chalo Mobility Private Limited to build an NCMC-compliant digital ticketing solution for both cities' fleets; live NCMC acceptance not yet confirmed.
Karnataka	Bengaluru Metropolitan Region	Bengaluru Metro Rail Corporation Limited	Bengaluru Metro System (Namma Metro)	Complete Network	Cash paid at counters for reusable plastic tokens (no ticket vending machines).; UPI-based QR tickets.; The NCMC.	RBL Bank Namma (BMRCL) Metro NCMC Card	RBL Bank	25 March 2023	The date previously given (21 October 2021) was only an announced target from a pre-launch news report; independent reporting confirms PM Modi inaugurated NCMC acceptance on Namma Metro on 25 March 2023, with general public issuance via RBL Bank from 30 March 2023, and explicitly notes the rollout had been delayed relative to Delhi, Mumbai and Kochi. Sale of NCMCs was later extended to all metro stations (previously limited to select stations and RBL Bank branches); the exact date of this all-station extension needs a firmer source.
Karnataka	Bengaluru Metropolitan Region	Bengaluru Metropolitan Transport Corporation	Bengaluru Bus System	Complete Network	Cash, and UPI/card payments via electronic ticketing machines (ETMs).; Some corporations also offer WhatsApp-based ticketing.	Any bank-issued NCMC (e.g. the RBL Bank Namma Metro NCMC Card)	Any NCMC-issuing bank	10–11 September 2026	General NCMC acceptance via ETMs installed under a roughly ₹30 crore, four-year contract. Separately, an NCMC-based "Shakti Smart Card" was cabinet-approved in February 2026 for BMTC/KSRTC/NWKRTC/KKRTC jointly, to digitise the Shakti free-bus scheme for women; as of 5 September 2026 it had not yet been issued, with women still travelling on Aadhaar ID verification alone.
Karnataka	Bengaluru Metropolitan Region	Rail Infrastructure Development Company (Karnataka) Limited	Bengaluru Suburban Railway System	N.A.	Cash and paper tickets at counters/machines, plus QR-code tickets via Indian Railways' UTS mobile app.; Monthly/seasonal passes.	N.A.	N.A.	N.A.	Under construction; commercial operations expected 2026. NCMC acceptance not yet applicable.
Karnataka	Hubballi–Dharwad	Hubballi–Dharwad BRTS Company Limited	Hubballi-Dharwad Bus Rapid Transit System (Chigari)	N.A.	Cash, QR-coded paper tickets, and the system's own closed-loop smart card/E-purse.; UPI accepted at some counters.	N.A.	N.A.	N.A.	Uses its own closed-loop E-purse smart card and QR-coded paper tickets; no NCMC integration confirmed as of September 2026.
Kerala	Kochi	Kochi Metro Rail Limited	Kochi Metro System	Complete Network	Cash, QR-coded paper tokens, and (on most systems) the operator's own closed-loop stored-value smart card.; Several systems also support UPI/QR-based ticketing at gates.	Kochi 1 Card	Axis Bank		
Kerala	Kochi	Kochi Water Metro Limited	Kochi Water Metro System	N.A.	Cash and QR-code-based mobile-app tickets via the Kochi Water Metro app.	N.A.	N.A.	N.A.	Ferry-based system with its own app-based ticketing; no confirmed NCMC integration. Operates independently of the Kerala State Water Transport Department's backwater ferry network (see § Regional systems).
Madhya Pradesh	Bhopal	Madhya Pradesh Metro Rail Corporation Limited	Bhopal Metro System	N.A.	Cash, QR-coded paper tokens, and (on most systems) the operator's own closed-loop stored-value smart card.; Several systems also support UPI/QR-based ticketing at gates.	N.A.	N.A.	N.A.	Priority corridor (Subhash Nagar–AIIMS) opened for commercial operations on 21 December 2025. Financial-institution tender for NCMC issuance floated May 2026; acceptance had not begun as of September 2026.
Madhya Pradesh	Indore	Madhya Pradesh Metro Rail Corporation Limited	Indore Metro System	N.A.	Cash, QR-coded paper tokens, and (on most systems) the operator's own closed-loop stored-value smart card.; Several systems also support UPI/QR-based ticketing at gates.	N.A.	N.A.	N.A.	Priority section operational since 2024. NCMC acceptance pending the same 2026 MPMRCL tender (see Bhopal, above).
Madhya Pradesh	Indore	Atal Indore City Transport Services Limited	Indore City Bus System	N.A.	Cash and paper tickets.; Cashless ticketing via a Chalo-branded smart card/app, deployed on route R-4 from January 2023.	Chalo Card (AICTSL)	N.A.	N.A.	AICTSL, a PPP city-bus operator jointly owned by the Indore Municipal Corporation and Indore Development Authority, deployed Chalo-branded cashless ticketing from January 2023. Whether this specific deployment is NCMC/RuPay-spec (as Chalo's Mumbai/BEST partnership is, see below) or a closed-loop Chalo implementation is unconfirmed; treated as red pending confirmation.
Maharashtra	Mumbai Metropolitan Region	Mumbai Metropolitan Region Development Authority	Mumbai Monorail System	N.A.	Cash and QR-coded paper tokens/smart cards at counters.	N.A.	N.A.	N.A.	Conventional smart-card and token ticketing; no NCMC integration.
Maharashtra	Mumbai Metropolitan Region	Brihanmumbai Electric Supply and Transport	Mumbai Bus system	Complete Network	Cash, and UPI/card payments via electronic ticketing machines (ETMs).; Some corporations also offer WhatsApp-based ticketing.	Chalo Card	YES Bank	25 April 2022	
Maharashtra	Mumbai Metropolitan Region	Mumbai Metro One Private Limited	Mumbai Metro System (Line 1)	Complete Network	Paper QR single-journey tickets (~190,000 daily) from counters/TVMs, mobile/WhatsApp QR tickets via the Mumbai One app and third-party apps (~150,000 daily), NCMC/One Mumbai smart card.	One Mumbai Card	Axis Bank	28 June 2021	Corrected from an earlier revision, which had this line's operator and card details swapped with Line 2A/7 below; the "One Mumbai" NCMC card is issued specifically for MMOPL's Line 1, not the MMRDA-run Lines 2A/7.
Maharashtra	Mumbai Metropolitan Region	Maha Mumbai Metro Operation Corporation Limited	Mumbai Metro System (Line 2A/7)	Complete Network	Paper QR tickets from ticket-selling-officer counters or TVMs, QR tickets via the Mumbai 1 app, and NCMC/Mumbai 1 smart card (issued at station customer-care counters).	Mumbai 1 Metro Card	State Bank of India	19 January 2023	The "Mumbai 1" NCMC card, issued exclusively by SBI, was launched alongside Lines 2A and 7 and is specific to those MMRDA/MMMOCL-run lines.
Maharashtra	Mumbai Metropolitan Region	Maha Mumbai Metro Operation Corporation Limited	Mumbai Metro System (Line 2B / Line 9)	Complete Network	Cash/UPI/card ticketing consistent with the operator's other MMR lines; NCMC-compliant readers installed from opening.			7 April 2026	Phase I of Line 2B (Diamond Garden–Mandale) and Line 9 Phase 1 (Dahisar East–Kashigaon) both opened for passenger service on 7 April 2026 (commercial services from 8 April), confirmed via MMRDA's own project page and independent press coverage explicitly stating the line supports "QR codes and NCMC-compliant smart cards" from opening. This line was operational and NCMC-enabled for roughly five months before it was first represented in this article.
Maharashtra	Mumbai Metropolitan Region	Mumbai Metro Rail Corporation Ltd	Mumbai Metro System (Line 3)	Complete Network	Cash/UPI/card paid at station token machines for a reusable plastic chip token (tapped at entry, dropped at exit).; QR tickets via the dedicated MetroConnect3 app or Paytm/PhonePe.; NCMC, which also works across Lines 1, 2A and 7 and on BEST buses.	Mumbai Metro-3 card	State Bank of India	10 June 2025	
Maharashtra	Mumbai Metropolitan Region	Central Railway; Western Railway	Mumbai Suburban Railway System	N.A.	Cash and paper tickets at counters/machines, plus QR-code tickets via Indian Railways' UTS mobile app.; Monthly/seasonal passes.	N.A.	N.A.	N.A.	Ticketing via the UTS app and paper tickets; not NCMC-integrated despite MRVC's stated ambitions (see § Implementation).
Maharashtra	Nagpur	Maharashtra Metro Rail Corporation Limited (Maha Metro)	Nagpur Metro System	N.A.	Existing closed-loop Maha Card (cash/counter), plus QR ticketing introduced in April 2026 via a Paytm/ONDC integration allowing app-based QR tickets without a physical token.	Nagpur Metro Maha Card	State Bank of India	N.A.	Existing closed-loop Maha Card is being migrated to an open-loop NCMC-based system under a ₹154.30 crore AFC tender; contract award pending as of September 2026.
Maharashtra	Nagpur	Nagpur Mahanagar Parivahan Limited	Nagpur's Aapli Bus System	Complete Network	Cash and UPI/card payments via electronic ticketing machines; live bus tracking and Chalo Card tap-to-pay wallet available via the Chalo app. NCMC compatible card launched in April 2025	N.A.	N.A.	N.A.	Operator name fixed from "NMPML" (which is Pune's acronym) to NMPL, and updated to reflect the 2024 operator change from DIMTS to Chalo Mobility Private Limited. Confirmed as a currently-operating city bus service (241 routes, ~2,265 stops) via NMC's own transport department page and ongoing local news coverage as recent as 14 September 2026; . NCMC was adopted in April 2025Operators like Bharat Yatra Card have also included support for Aapli Bus
Maharashtra	Navi Mumbai (Mumbai Metropolitan Region)	City and Industrial Development Corporation	Navi Mumbai Metro System	N.A.	Cash, QR-coded paper tokens, and (on most systems) the operator's own closed-loop stored-value smart card.; Several systems also support UPI/QR-based ticketing at gates.	N.A.	N.A.	N.A.	Opened 17 November 2023; no NCMC acceptance announced as of September 2026.
Maharashtra	Navi Mumbai (Mumbai Metropolitan Region)	Navi Mumbai Municipal Transport	Navi Mumbai Bus System	N.A.	Cash, and UPI/card payments via electronic ticketing machines (ETMs).	N.A.	N.A.	14 August 2022	Commissioned date corrected to the actual NCMC rollout (August 2022); an earlier revision had listed the 2019 launch of the closed-loop "Navi Card" instead, which is a different product.
Maharashtra	Pune Metropolitan Region	Maharashtra Metro Rail Corporation Limited (Maha Metro)	Pune Metro System	Complete Network	Cash/UPI/debit card at TVMs and ticket counters for paper QR tickets or tokens.; WhatsApp-based QR ticketing.; The Pune Metro mobile app (with a Paytm/ONDC QR integration added April 2026).; NCMC, valid across all three Pune Metro lines.	One Pune Card	HDFC Bank		
Maharashtra	Pune Metropolitan Region	Central Railway	Pune Suburban Railway	N.A.	Cash and paper tickets at counters/machines, plus QR-code tickets via Indian Railways' UTS mobile app.; Monthly/seasonal passes.	N.A.	N.A.	N.A.	Conventional Indian Railways ticketing; not NCMC-integrated.
Maharashtra	Pune; Pimpri-Chinchwad; (Pune Metropolitan Region)	Pune Mahanagar Parivahan Mahamandal Limited (PMPML)	Pune Bus System; Pimpri-Chinchwad Bus System; Rainbow Bus Rapid Transit System	N.A.	Cash, and UPI/card payments via electronic ticketing machines (ETMs).	N.A.	N.A.	N.A.	Despite the 'One Pune' NCMC card being live on Pune Metro since 2021, integration with PMPML buses has stalled: as of late 2024 the card remained "only functional for Metro travel", with PMPML–Metro ticketing integration talks reported at a standstill. Of Pune/Pimpri-Chinchwad's original four-corridor Rainbow BRT network, Pune's own segment is being dismantled while the Pimpri-Chinchwad Municipal Corporation's roughly 54 km portion continues to operate as of 2026.
Maharashtra	Thane	Maharashtra Metro Rail Corporation Limited (Maha Metro)	Thane Metro System	N.A.	Not yet operational.; Specific ticketing modes not yet determined.	N.A.	N.A.	N.A.	Under construction; civil works began 2025. NCMC acceptance anticipated on opening, but no rollout confirmed as of September 2026.
Maharashtra	Thane (Kalyan)	Suyog Gurbaxani Funicular Ropeways Limited	Shree Malanggad Funicular Railway	N.A.	Cash tickets; not yet digitised as of this writing.	N.A.	N.A.	N.A.	A 1.2 km cable-hauled funicular near Kalyan in Thane district, described as India's longest funicular railway, opened in January 2026 after years of planning; carries about 120 passengers per trip, replacing a multi-hour uphill climb with a 7–10 minute ride. A new transport mode for this article, like the Varanasi ropeway above. No NCMC integration confirmed as of September 2026.
Odisha	Bhubaneswar; Cuttack; Puri; Rourkela; Sambalpur; Brahmapur	Comprehensive Region Urban Transport	Ama Bus System	Complete Network	Cash, the Ama Bus mobile app, WhatsApp-based ticketing, and Odisha Yatri app integration.	NCMC (Ama Bus digital pass/card)	State Bank of India / Airtel Payments Bank	31 August 2025	Launched alongside WhatsApp-based ticketing and digital fare discounts across all operational Ama Bus service areas; distinct from the statewide Odisha State Road Transport Corporation network (see Statewide systems, below), which is not confirmed to accept NCMC.
Rajasthan	Jaipur	Jaipur Metro Rail Corporation Limited	Jaipur Metro System	N.A.	RFID-based single-journey and round-trip tokens from counters.; The closed-loop Smart Card.; A shift toward paperless QR tickets via the OneJaipur mobile app.	N.A.	N.A.	N.A.	System is being upgraded to be NCMC compliant; no confirmed completion date.
Rajasthan	Jaipur	Jaipur City Transport Services Limited	Jaipur Bus System	N.A.	Cash, and UPI/digital-wallet payments through the official JCTSL mobile ticketing app.; No NCMC integration mentioned.	N.A.	N.A.	N.A.	Legally distinct from Jaipur Metro (above); no NCMC acceptance announced as of September 2026.
Tamil Nadu	Chennai Metropolitan Area	Chennai Metro Rail Limited	Chennai Metro System	Complete Network	Paper QR single-journey tickets from counters (TVMs are being phased out across 41 stations as tokens/smart cards are discontinued).; Digital QR tickets via the CMRL app, WhatsApp, PhonePe, Paytm and Uber (20% fare discount).; NCMC.	Singara Chennai Card	State Bank of India	14 April 2023	
Tamil Nadu	Chennai Metropolitan Area	Metropolitan Transport Corporation	Chennai Bus System	Complete Network	Cash, and UPI/card payments via electronic ticketing machines (ETMs).; Some corporations also offer WhatsApp-based ticketing.	Singara Chennai Card	State Bank of India	6 January 2025	
Tamil Nadu	Chennai Metropolitan Area	Southern Railway	Chennai Mass Rapid Transit System	N.A.	Cash, with UPI/QR-code payments via ETMs where digitised.	N.A.	N.A.	N.A.	Under implementation.
Tamil Nadu	Chennai Metropolitan Area	Southern Railway	Chennai Suburban Railway System	N.A.	Cash and paper tickets at counters/machines, plus QR-code tickets via Indian Railways' UTS mobile app.; Monthly/seasonal passes.	N.A.	N.A.	N.A.	Under implementation. Same card-name formatting correction as Chennai MRTS above.
Telangana	Hyderabad Metropolitan Region	Hyderabad Metro Rail Limited	Hyderabad Metro System	Complete Network	Printed single/return-journey paper tickets with a QR code, sold at station ticket counters.; Paperless QR e-tickets via PhonePe, Paytm, Rapido, T-Savaari or WhatsApp.; The closed-loop smart card.; NCMC.	Paytm Wallet Transit Card	Paytm Payments Bank	24 August 2023	
Telangana	Hyderabad Metropolitan Region	Telangana State Road Transport Corporation (Greater Hyderabad Zone)	Hyderabad Bus System	N.A.	Cash, and UPI/card payments via electronic ticketing machines (ETMs).	N.A.	N.A.	N.A.	A joint Hyderabad Metro Rail–TSRTC Common Mobility Card was announced by Telangana ministers in July 2023, with SBI demonstrating ticketing hardware to a joint task force, and issuance originally targeted for August 2023. No source confirms it was ever implemented; treated as red/stalled, same basis as Pune's PMPML row above.
Telangana	Hyderabad Metropolitan Region	South Central Railway	Hyderabad Multi-Modal Transport System	N.A.	Cash and paper tickets at counters/machines, plus QR-code tickets via Indian Railways' UTS mobile app.; Monthly/seasonal passes.	N.A.	N.A.	N.A.	Not NCMC-integrated.
Uttar Pradesh	Agra	Uttar Pradesh Metro Rail Corporation	Agra Metro System	N.A.	Cash, QR-coded paper tokens, and (on most systems) the operator's own closed-loop stored-value smart card.; Several systems also support UPI/QR-based ticketing at gates.	N.A.	N.A.	N.A.	Priority section operational since March 2024; unlike UPMRC's Lucknow and Kanpur lines, no NCMC rollout date announced.
Uttar Pradesh	Kanpur	Uttar Pradesh Metro Rail Corporation	Kanpur Metro System	Complete Network	No tokens — QR tickets only, either printed at Ticket Office Machines/TVMs/Excess Fare Offices or generated paperlessly in the Kanpur Metro mobile app.; NCMC (10% fare discount for cardholders).	Kanpur Metro	State Bank of India	4 April 2023	
Uttar Pradesh	Lucknow–Kanpur corridor	Northern Railway	Lucknow–Kanpur Suburban Railway System	N.A.	Cash and paper tickets at counters/machines, plus QR-code tickets via Indian Railways' UTS mobile app.; Monthly/seasonal passes.	N.A.	N.A.	N.A.	previously entirely absent from this article. A distinct Indian Railways suburban service along the roughly 72 km Lucknow–Kanpur route, separate from both cities' metro systems; conventional Indian Railways ticketing only, not NCMC-integrated.
Uttar Pradesh	Barabanki–Lucknow corridor	Northern Railway	Barabanki–Lucknow Suburban Railway System	N.A.	Cash and paper tickets at counters/machines, plus QR-code tickets via Indian Railways' UTS mobile app.; Monthly/seasonal passes.	N.A.	N.A.	N.A.	previously entirely absent from this article. A roughly 65 km Indian Railways suburban service, separate from Lucknow Metro; conventional Indian Railways ticketing only, not NCMC-integrated.
Uttar Pradesh	Lucknow	Uttar Pradesh Metro Rail Corporation	Lucknow Metro System	Complete Network	Cash-paid plastic tokens from standard TVMs, plus a newer parallel QR-based system (paper QR from designated TVMs/counters or digital QR via the Lucknow Metro app) with UPI support at QR-enabled machines.; NCMC.	GoSmart NCMC Card	Airtel Payments Bank	21 July 2026	System has been upgraded to NCMC compliant.
Uttar Pradesh	Meerut (Delhi National Capital Region)	National Capital Region Transport Corporation Limited	Meerut Metro System	Complete Network	Cash, QR-coded paper tokens, and (on most systems) the operator's own closed-loop stored-value smart card.; Several systems also support UPI/QR-based ticketing at gates.	Airtel Rupay NCMC Card	Airtel Payments Bank	22 February 2026	A distinct system from the Namo Bharat RRTS (see § Regional systems) — it has its own rolling stock (slower, metro-style trainsets vs the 160 km/h Namo Bharat trains) and stations exclusive to it (e.g. the underground Meerut Central metro station, which Namo Bharat trains pass through without stopping) — but shares the same elevated/underground viaduct and several interchange stations, marking the first time in India that a regional rail and a metro service run on common infrastructure.
Uttar Pradesh	Noida; Greater Noida; (Delhi National Capital Region)	Noida Metro Rail Corporation	Noida Metro System	Complete Network	No plastic tokens — QR-coded paper tickets sold at ticketing windows or a limited number of Cashless Ticket Vending Machines (CTVMs), plus mobile-app QR tickets via the NMRC app.; Cash or digital payment accepted at counters.; NCMC.	NMRC City1 Card	State Bank of India	15 August 2026	The previously cited date (28 December 2021) reused a citation about Delhi's Airport Express Line and does not describe Noida Metro. Card-issuance figures reported by The Tribune point instead to the SBI NMRC City1 card being in circulation from around the Aqua Line's opening in January 2019 — predating the national NCMC standard's own March 2019 launch — so whether the card was NCMC-certified from day one or upgraded later remains unconfirmed.
Uttar Pradesh	Varanasi	National Highways Logistics Management Limited	Kashi Ropeway System	N.A.	Reserved-seat ropeway cabins; ticketing model not yet finalised.	N.A.	N.A.	N.A.	India's first urban ropeway, part of the Parvatmala Pariyojana National Ropeway Development Programme; construction began 24 March 2022. Still under testing as of September 2026 after repeated delays past a targeted May 2026 opening. No NCMC integration confirmed.
West Bengal	Kolkata Metropolitan Area	Metro Railway, Kolkata	Kolkata Metro System	N.A.	Cash, QR-coded paper tokens, and (on most systems) the operator's own closed-loop stored-value smart card.; Several systems also support UPI/QR-based ticketing at gates.	N.A.	N.A.	N.A.	No NCMC deployment reported as of 2022, and this remained the case as of September 2025: Metro Railway Kolkata extended its own closed-loop smart card's validity from one to ten years that month, and its ticketing documentation continues to describe only tokens and the closed-loop smart card, with no mention of NCMC.
West Bengal	Kolkata Metropolitan Area	West Bengal Transport Corporation (CSTC Wing)	Kolkata Bus System	N.A.	Cash and paper tickets only.	N.A.	N.A.	N.A.	
West Bengal	Kolkata Metropolitan Area	West Bengal Transport Corporation (CTC Wing)	Kolkata Tram System	N.A.	Cash and paper tickets only.	N.A.	N.A.	N.A.	Heritage service; conventional ticketing only. Calcutta Tramways Company (CTC) was merged into WBTC on 8 June 2016, along with the Calcutta State Transport Corporation (CSTC) and West Bengal Surface Transport Corporation (WBSTC); CTC now operates the tram network as a wing of WBTC rather than as an independent company.
West Bengal	Kolkata Metropolitan Area	West Bengal Transport Corporation (WBSTC Wing)	Kolkata Ferry System	N.A.	Cash tickets at ghats/jetties.	N.A.	N.A.	N.A.	
West Bengal	Kolkata Metropolitan Area	Eastern Railway; South Eastern Railway	Kolkata Suburban Railway System	N.A.	Cash and paper tickets at counters/machines, plus QR-code tickets via Indian Railways' UTS mobile app.; Monthly/seasonal passes.	N.A.	N.A.	N.A.	Ticketing largely paper-based or via the UTS app; not NCMC-integrated.

=== Regional systems ===
Multi-district, interstate, or union-territory-wide transit systems that are not confined to a single urban area (and so do not fit Urban & Suburban) and are not road-based State Road Transport Corporation networks (and so do not fit Statewide). This includes inland and inter-island water transport, and interstate/regional rapid transit rail corridors serving a wider region rather than a single metropolitan area.

State / UT	Region	Operator	System	Acceptance	Other Payment/Ticketing Modes	Card Name	Issuing Bank	Commissioned	Comments
Delhi; Uttar Pradesh	Delhi National Capital Region	National Capital Region Transport Corporation Limited	Namo Bharat Regional Rapid Transit System	Complete Network	Cash, QR-coded paper tokens, and the operator's own closed-loop stored-value smart card.; UPI/QR-based ticketing at gates.	Airtel Rupay NCMC Card	Airtel Payments Bank	21 October 2023	Airtel Payments Bank was chosen after RBI banned operations of Paytm payments bank. Full 82 km corridor completed on 22 February 2026. The Delhi–Alwar and Delhi–Panipat RRTS corridors remained in pre-construction planning (general consultant appointment, design) as of September 2026 and are not listed separately here. Moved to this section from Urban & Suburban, since it is genuinely interstate rather than confined to one metropolitan area.
Goa; Karnataka	Pernem–Karwar corridor	Konkan Railway	Pernem–Karwar Suburban Railway	N.A.	Cash and paper tickets at counters/machines, plus QR-code tickets via Indian Railways' UTS mobile app.; Monthly/seasonal passes.	N.A.	N.A.	N.A.	previously entirely absent from this article. An interstate Indian Railways suburban service spanning roughly 117 km between Pernem (Goa) and Karwar (Karnataka); placed here rather than under Urban & Suburban since it is not confined to a single metropolitan area. Conventional Indian Railways ticketing only, not NCMC-integrated.
Kerala	Kerala Backwaters	Kerala State Water Transport Department	Kerala Backwater Ferry Network	N.A.	Cash tickets at jetties.	N.A.	N.A.	N.A.	Operates 81 boats across roughly 1,895 km of backwaters and canals; the department was established in 1968 and serves Alappuzha, Kottayam, Kollam, Ernakulam, Kannur and Kasaragod districts. Operates independently of KMRL's Kochi Water Metro (listed under Urban & Suburban). No NCMC integration confirmed as of September 2026.
Assam	Brahmaputra and Barak valleys	Assam Inland Waterways Company Limited (AIWCL)	Assam Ferry Services (Brahmaputra/Barak)	N.A.	Cash and e-ticketing at select terminals.	N.A.	N.A.	N.A.	Assam Inland Waterways Company Limited (AIWCL) was established in 2022 alongside a separate regulatory body, the Assam Inland Water Transport Regulatory Authority (AIWTRA); the former operator, the Directorate of Inland Water Transport (Assam), was formally disbanded/"unbundled" in February 2026, with its assets and operations transferred to AIWCL, confirmed by two independent local news reports. No NCMC integration confirmed as of September 2026.
Goa	Statewide river crossings	River Navigation Department, Government of Goa	Goa River Ferry Services	N.A.	Free for foot passengers and two-wheelers; toll charged for four-wheelers and cargo.	N.A.	N.A.	N.A.	
Andaman & Nicobar Islands	Port Blair–Havelock–Neil Island and wider inter-island network	Directorate of Shipping Services (DSS), A&N Administration	Inter-Island Ferry Services	N.A.	Cash and online booking via the DSS eTicketing portal (STARS counters); some routes also served by private operators.	N.A.	N.A.	N.A.	
Lakshadweep	Kochi–Lakshadweep mainland and inter-island network	Union Territory of Lakshadweep Administration (Port, Shipping & Aviation Department)	Inter-Island Ferry & High-Speed Craft Services	N.A.	Cash tickets; seasonal service (high-speed craft run 15 September–15 May).	N.A.	N.A.	N.A.	5 all-weather passenger ships plus 6 seasonal high-speed craft, run directly by the Administration rather than a separate corporate body. No NCMC integration confirmed as of September 2026.

=== Statewide systems ===
Bus networks operated by State Road Transport Corporations (RTCs) and equivalent state undertakings. Several states and Union Territories are omitted from this table entirely, rather than given a row, because they have no state-run or state-regulated bus operator that NCMC acceptance could meaningfully apply to: Jharkhand and Chhattisgarh are the clearest cases (see the note at the end of this section). Where a state has revived, relaunched, or newly established a state transport undertaking, or is in the process of doing so, it is given a row even where the fleet is very small, so that the absence of a row elsewhere in this section can be read as a genuine finding rather than an oversight.

State	Operator	Coverage	Acceptance	Other Payment/Ticketing Modes	Card Name	Issuing Bank	Commissioned	Comments
Andhra Pradesh	Andhra Pradesh State Road Transport Corporation	Statewide	N.A.	Cash, with UPI/QR-code payments via ETMs where digitised.; No NCMC-specific ticketing confirmed.	N.A.	N.A.	N.A.	No NCMC acceptance announced as of September 2026.
Arunachal Pradesh	Arunachal Pradesh State Transport Services (APSTS)	Statewide	N.A.	Cash, with UPI/QR-code payments via ETMs where digitised.	N.A.	N.A.	N.A.	APSTS was founded 15 December 1975, headquartered in Itanagar; runs daily interstate services to Tezpur/Guwahati (Assam), Shillong (Meghalaya) and Dimapur (Nagaland). No NCMC acceptance or pilot found.
Assam	Assam State Transport Corporation	Partial (Guwahati counters only)	Partial (limited counters)	Cash at counters.; Digital payments limited to the pilot NCMC counters noted above.	—	—	1 January 2024	Issuance limited to a handful of ASTC counters and kiosks in Guwahati; requires Aadhaar-linked KYC. See § Concerns.
Bihar	Bihar State Road Transport Corporation	Statewide	N.A.	Cash, with UPI/QR-code payments via ETMs where digitised.; No NCMC-specific ticketing confirmed.	N.A.	N.A.	N.A.	No NCMC acceptance announced as of September 2026.
Chandigarh	Chandigarh Transport Undertaking	UT-wide	N.A.	Cash, with UPI/QR-code payments via ETMs where digitised.; No NCMC-specific ticketing confirmed.	N.A.	N.A.	N.A.	Active operator (~600-vehicle fleet) per its own Wikipedia article; no NCMC acceptance announced as of September 2026.
Goa	Kadamba Transport Corporation	Statewide	Complete Network	Cash and UPI/card payments via ETMs.	One Goa One Card	Paytm	21 December 2021	
Gujarat	Gujarat State Road Transport Corporation	Statewide	N.A.	Cash, with UPI/QR-code payments via ETMs where digitised.; No NCMC-specific ticketing confirmed.	N.A.	N.A.	N.A.	No NCMC acceptance announced as of September 2026.
Haryana	Haryana Roadways	Statewide	Partial	Cash, with UPI/card payments via ETMs being rolled out route-by-route.	AU Haryana Roadways NCMC Card	AU Small Finance Bank	13 December 2023	An AU Small Finance Bank announcement dated March 2025 states the system already serves 1.8 million-plus cardholders travelling on Haryana Roadways buses, and the RuPay NCMC solution (with Haryana Roadways, Aurionpro and NPCI) was recognised at the Transport Ticketing Global Awards 2025 in London — suggesting the rollout is considerably more mature than "still expanding route-by-route" implies, though a precise network-wide completion figure was not found. Retained as "Partial" pending a source confirming full statewide completion.
Himachal Pradesh	Himachal Road Transport Corporation	Statewide	Complete Network	Cash and UPI/card payments via ETMs.	SBI HRTC NCMC Card	State Bank of India	5 September 2024	
Jammu and Kashmir	Jammu & Kashmir Road Transport Corporation (JKRTC)	UT-wide (excludes Srinagar SSCL and Jammu JSCL e-buses, listed separately under Urban & Suburban)	N.A.	Cash, with UPI/QR-code payments via ETMs where digitised.; No NCMC-specific ticketing confirmed.	N.A.	N.A.	N.A.	Jammu & Kashmir Road Transport Corporation (JKRTC) is a rename of the same continuously operating corporation formerly called Jammu and Kashmir State Road Transport Corporation (JKSRTC) — not a defunct entity replaced by a new one — with the rebranding coinciding with J&K's 2019 reorganisation into a union territory; the corporation's own current website still resolves at its historical jksrtc.co.in domain. No NCMC acceptance announced as of September 2026.
Karnataka	Karnataka State Road Transport Corporation	Southern Karnataka	N.A.	Cash, UPI/card payments via ETMs, and WhatsApp-based ticketing via the One Karnataka Mobility app.	N.A. (Shakti scheme planned)	N.A.	N.A.	Cabinet-approved NCMC-based "Shakti Smart Card" planned jointly across KSRTC, BMTC, NWKRTC and KKRTC for the Shakti free-bus scheme for women (see BMTC row above); not yet issued as of September 2026.
Karnataka	North Western Karnataka Road Transport Corporation	Kitturu Karnataka (North Western)	N.A.	Cash, UPI/card payments via ETMs, and WhatsApp-based ticketing via the One Karnataka Mobility app.	N.A. (Shakti scheme planned)	N.A.	N.A.	Same planned statewide Shakti Smart Card rollout as KSRTC, above; not yet issued.
Karnataka	Kalyana Karnataka Road Transport Corporation	Kalyana Karnataka (North Eastern)	N.A.	Cash, UPI/card payments via ETMs, and WhatsApp-based ticketing via the One Karnataka Mobility app.	N.A. (Shakti scheme planned)	N.A.	N.A.	Same planned statewide Shakti Smart Card rollout as KSRTC, above; not yet issued.
Kerala	Kerala State Road Transport Corporation	Statewide	N.A.	Cash, with online booking via the KSRTC reservation portal for long-distance services; a closed-loop KSRTC Travel Card was rolled out for on-bus digital payment, but does not interoperate with other transport modes.	N.A.	N.A.	N.A.	No NCMC acceptance announced as of September 2026; commentators have called for an NCMC/"One Nation, One Card"-style integrated system along the lines of Kochi's Kochi1 card, but several hurdles remain unresolved. Its former urban-service subsidiary, the Kerala Urban Road Transport Corporation (KURTC), was wound up in 2022 and its operations folded back into KSRTC, so it is not listed separately.
Kerala	K-SWIFT	Statewide (Long Distance)	N.A.	Cash, UPI/card payments via ETMs, and online/mobile app booking for reserved long-distance services.	N.A.	N.A.	N.A.	Legally separate long-distance operating subsidiary of KSRTC, formed 2021; no NCMC acceptance announced as of September 2026.
Madhya Pradesh	Government of Madhya Pradesh (PPP model; Mukhyamantri Sugam Parivahan Seva)	Statewide	N.A.	Cash/UPI/card via private operators under the new PPP scheme; ticketing model still being rolled out.	N.A.	N.A.	N.A.	Madhya Pradesh State Road Transport Corporation (MPSRTC, peak fleet ~2,700 buses) was dissolved in January 2005 after losses exceeding ₹750 crore and a roughly 1:11 employee-to-bus ratio, leaving the state without a government bus operator for two decades. The state cabinet subsequently approved Mukhyamantri Sugam Parivahan Seva, a PPP-model scheme under which the government regulates fares and routes while private operators run a planned fleet exceeding 5,200 buses, with Chief Minister Mohan Yadav announcing a 25 September 2026 launch. No NCMC integration announced as of this writing.
Maharashtra	Maharashtra State Road Transport Corporation	Statewide	Complete Network	Cash, with UPI/QR-code and Card payments via ETMs	N.A.	NSDL Payments Bank	1 April 2026	
Manipur	Manipur State Transport (MST)	Imphal city and nearby hill-district routes	N.A.	Cash, with UPI/QR-code payments via ETMs where digitised.	N.A.	N.A.	N.A.	MST went defunct in the late 1990s and was revived 25 June 2017; ran 34 buses across 31 routes as of December 2024, including a resumed Imphal–Dimapur–Guwahati interstate service. Much smaller scale than MSRTC or KSRTC. No NCMC acceptance or pilot found.
Meghalaya	Meghalaya Transport Corporation	Statewide, based in Shillong	N.A.	Cash, with UPI/QR-code payments via ETMs where digitised.	N.A.	N.A.	N.A.	MTC runs roughly 45 daily routes from Shillong, including interstate services to Guwahati and Silchar. No NCMC acceptance or pilot found.
Mizoram	Mizoram State Transport Authority	Aizawl town and inter-district/interstate routes	N.A.	Cash, with UPI/QR-code payments via ETMs where digitised.	N.A.	N.A.	N.A.	Operates Aizawl town buses and inter-district/interstate routes, including an Aizawl–Jampui Hills, Tripura service. No NCMC acceptance or pilot found.
Nagaland	Nagaland State Transport	Statewide	N.A.	Cash and UPI/card payments via ETMs; GPS tracking and handheld ticketing machines in use.	N.A.	N.A.	N.A.	NST was founded in 1964 and runs a roughly 171-vehicle fleet; a May 2026 Tata Motors deal added 43 buses. No NCMC acceptance or pilot found.
Odisha	Odisha State Road Transport Corporation	Statewide	N.A.	Cash, with UPI/QR-code payments via ETMs where digitised.; No NCMC-specific ticketing confirmed.	N.A.	N.A.	N.A.	No NCMC acceptance announced as of September 2026.
Puducherry	Puducherry Road Transport Corporation	UT-wide	N.A.	Cash, with UPI/QR-code payments via ETMs where digitised.; No NCMC-specific ticketing confirmed.	N.A.	N.A.	N.A.	No NCMC acceptance announced as of September 2026.
Punjab	Punjab Roadways	Statewide	N.A.	Cash, with UPI/QR-code payments via ETMs where digitised.; No NCMC-specific ticketing confirmed.	N.A.	N.A.	N.A.	No NCMC acceptance announced as of September 2026.
Punjab	Punjab State Bus Management Company Ltd (PUNBUS)	Statewide	N.A.	Cash, with UPI/QR-code payments via ETMs where digitised.; No NCMC-specific ticketing confirmed.	N.A.	N.A.	N.A.	No NCMC acceptance announced as of September 2026.
Punjab	PEPSU Road Transport Corporation	Statewide	N.A.	Cash, with UPI/QR-code payments via ETMs where digitised.; No NCMC-specific ticketing confirmed.	N.A.	N.A.	N.A.	No NCMC acceptance announced as of September 2026.
Rajasthan	Rajasthan State Road Transport Corporation	Statewide	N.A.	Cash, with UPI/QR-code payments via ETMs where digitised.; No NCMC-specific ticketing confirmed.	N.A.	N.A.	N.A.	No NCMC acceptance announced as of September 2026.
Sikkim	Sikkim Nationalised Transport	Statewide	N.A.	Cash, with UPI/QR-code payments via ETMs where digitised.; No NCMC-specific ticketing confirmed.	N.A.	N.A.	N.A.	No NCMC acceptance announced as of September 2026.
Tamil Nadu	Tamil Nadu State Transport Corporation	Statewide	N.A.	Cash and UPI-based WhatsApp ticketing, plus online/mobile app booking for reserved services.	N.A.	N.A.	N.A.	No NCMC acceptance announced as of September 2026.
Tamil Nadu	State Express Transport Corporation	Statewide (Long-distance)	N.A.	Cash and UPI-based WhatsApp ticketing, plus online/mobile app booking for reserved services.	N.A.	N.A.	N.A.	Legally separate Tamil Nadu transport undertaking (one of eight state corporations) dedicated to mofussil express services exceeding 300 km; distinct from both TNSTC's regional corporations and Chennai's MTC (listed under Urban & Suburban). No NCMC acceptance announced as of September 2026.
Telangana	Telangana State Road Transport Corporation	Statewide (excludes Hyderabad services, listed separately under Urban & Suburban)	N.A.	Cash, with UPI/QR-code payments via ETMs where digitised.; No NCMC-specific ticketing confirmed.	N.A.	N.A.	N.A.	No NCMC acceptance announced statewide as of September 2026; see the Hyderabad City Bus row under Urban & Suburban for the separate, stalled Hyderabad-specific Common Mobility Card initiative.
Tripura	Tripura Road Transport Corporation	Statewide	N.A.	Cash, with UPI/QR-code payments via ETMs where digitised.	N.A.	N.A.	N.A.	TRTC was established in 1969 and remains active; in February 2026 it resumed the "Royal Maitree" Agartala–Dhaka–Kolkata service. No NCMC acceptance or pilot found.
Uttar Pradesh	Uttar Pradesh State Road Transport Corporation	Statewide	N.A.	Cash, with UPI/QR-code payments via ETMs where digitised.; No NCMC-specific ticketing confirmed.	N.A.	N.A.	N.A.	No NCMC acceptance announced as of September 2026.
Uttarakhand	Uttarakhand Transport Corporation	Statewide	N.A.	Cash, with UPI/QR-code payments via ETMs where digitised.; No NCMC-specific ticketing confirmed.	N.A.	N.A.	N.A.	No NCMC acceptance announced as of September 2026.
West Bengal	West Bengal Transport Corporation	Statewide (excludes Kolakata services, listed separately under Urban & Suburban)	N.A.	Cash, with UPI/QR-code payments via ETMs where digitised.; No NCMC-specific ticketing confirmed.	N.A.	N.A.	N.A.	No NCMC acceptance announced as of September 2026. (The Kolkata urban tram and ferry services of this same operator are listed separately under Urban & Suburban.)

Jharkhand and Chhattisgarh have no row in this table because neither has a state-run or state-regulated bus operator to which NCMC acceptance could meaningfully apply:

- Jharkhand has no fully functional, traditional state-owned road transport corporation for inter-city or statewide bus services; road transport relies almost entirely on private operators under permits issued by the Transport Department. City bus services in Ranchi, Jamshedpur and Dhanbad are facilitated by the Urban Development Department under these permits, including a ₹605 crore, 244-bus PPP contract for the Ranchi Municipal Corporation area approved by the state cabinet in 2023. A separate registered entity, Jharkhand Urban Transport Corporation Limited (JUTCOL), was incorporated in 2016, and a dedicated Jharkhand State Road Transport Corporation for remote-area connectivity has been proposed by the state government, though comprehensive state-run fleet operations remain limited compared to neighbouring states. Some vehicles have historically carried "Jharkhand State Road Transport Corporation" branding, but no evidence was found of it as a currently operating incorporated body distinct from the above. No NCMC integration confirmed for any of these as of September 2026.
- Chhattisgarh never established a centralized state road transport corporation after splitting from Madhya Pradesh in 2000; the Transport Department issues Stage Carriage Permits directly to private operators (e.g. CG Connect, Mahendra Travels, Payal Travels) connecting Raipur, Bilaspur and Jagdalpur. A Chief Minister Rural Bus Service Scheme (CMRBS) subsidises private operators on low-margin routes to tribal regions such as Bastar and Surguja. No NCMC integration confirmed as of September 2026.

Smaller state and union-territory road transport undertakings not individually named above (e.g. those restructured or privatised in a manner similar to Jharkhand and Chhattisgarh) are not confirmed to have adopted NCMC and are omitted here for lack of verifiable, system-specific sourcing. See also the caveat at the top of § Acceptance.

=== National systems ===
This category covers mainline and long-distance services operated directly by Indian Railways or by other central-government rail undertakings, excluding suburban rail (listed under Urban & Suburban systems above, since suburban networks function as part of a single city's transport system rather than as national or interstate services) and metro rail (which is run by separate statutory metro corporations, not Indian Railways).

Coverage	Operator	System	Acceptance	Other Payment/Ticketing Modes	Card Name	Issuing Bank	Commissioned	Comments
All India (mainline and long-distance, non-suburban)	Indian Railways	Mainline and long-distance passenger services (excludes suburban rail and metro rail, listed separately above)	N.A.	Cash and paper tickets at PRS (reserved) or UTS (unreserved) counters.; The IRCTC website & RailOne app for online reservation (UPI, cards, net banking) as well as for QR-based unreserved tickets.; BBPS-based NCMC recharge as a top-up channel only, not an at-gate ticketing system.	N.A.	N.A.	N.A.	As of September 2026, no non-suburban Indian Railways passenger service had adopted NCMC-based ticketing or had a publicly announced pilot; NCMC recharge is available for select NCMC cards through Indian Railways' partner the Bharat Bill Payment System (see § Bharat Bill Payment System integration), but this is a top-up channel rather than an at-gate acceptance system.
Mumbai–Ahmedabad corridor (Maharashtra, Gujarat)	National High Speed Rail Corporation Limited	Mumbai–Ahmedabad High Speed Rail (MAHSR)	N.A.	No finalised ticketing model as of September 2026; the underlying Signalling, SCADA & Ticketing design consultancy contract was itself only awarded (SYSTRA as L1 bidder) in January 2026, so a public ticketing specification could not yet exist.	N.A.	N.A.	N.A.	Under construction; first section (Surat–Bilimora, or an expanded Ahmedabad–Vapi stretch per revised planning) targeted for 2027, full corridor by 2029. No NCMC ticketing model confirmed; as reserved-seat high-speed rail with fares well above typical NCMC transit fares, it may end up structurally outside NCMC's tap-and-go design rather than merely awaiting rollout.

== See also ==
- RuPay
- National Payments Corporation of India
- FASTag
- Unified Payments Interface
- Aadhaar
- Urban rail transit in India
- Transport in India
