= Maharana Pratap Inter State Bus Terminus =

Inter State Bus Terminal in Delhi, India

Maharana Pratap Interstate Bus Terminus Kashmere Gate Interstate Bus Terminus महाराणा प्रताप अंतरराज्यीय बस अड्डा कश्मीरी गेट अंतरराज्यीय बस अड्डा
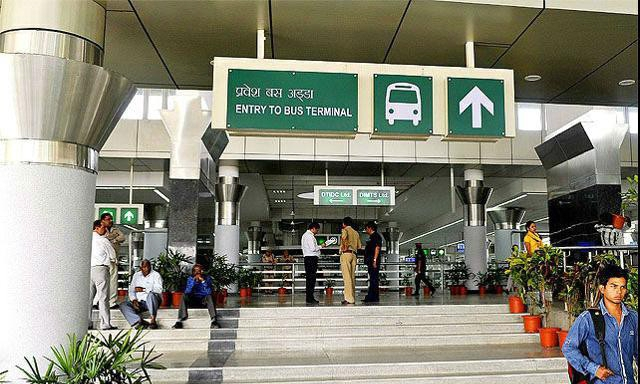
- Main entrance of the Maharana Pratap Interstate Bus Terminus

General information
- Location: Kashmere Gate, Delhi; National Capital Territory of Delhi; India
- Coordinates: 28.6686432°N 77.2294734°E
- System: DTC, HRST, HRTC, JKSRTC, PRTC, PR, RSRTC, UPSRTC & UTC ISBT
- Owner: Delhi Transport Infrastructure Development Corporation (DTIDC) Limited
- Operator: Delhi Tourism and Transportation Development Corporation
- Bus routes: National Capital Territory of Delhi; Haryana; Himachal Pradesh; Jammu and Kashmir; Ladakh; Punjab; Rajasthan; Uttar Pradesh; Uttarakhand
- Bus stands: Departure bus bays: 45; Idle bus bays: 8; Arrival bus bays: 13
- Bus operators: Delhi Transport Corporation; Haryana Roadways State Transport; Himachal Road Transport Corporation; Jammu and Kashmir State Road Transport Corporation; PEPSU Road Transport Corporation; Punjab Roadways; Rajasthan State Road Transport Corporation; Uttar Pradesh State Road Transport Corporation; Uttarakhand Transport Corporation
- Connections: Kashmere Gate Red Line Yellow Line Violet Line

Construction
- Parking: Yes
- Accessible: Yes

Other information
- Website: Maharana Pratap ISBT

History
- Opened: 1976
- Rebuilt: 2013
Location
- Location within Delhi Location within India

The Maharana Pratap Interstate Bus Terminus (Maharana Pratap ISBT), popularly known as Kashmere Gate Interstate Bus Terminus (Kashmere Gate ISBT), located in Kashmere Gate, Old Delhi, Delhi, India, is the oldest and one of the largest Inter-State Bus Terminals in India. It operates bus services between Delhi and the neighbouring states and union territories of Haryana, Jammu and Kashmir, Ladakh, Punjab, Himachal Pradesh, Uttar Pradesh, Rajasthan and Uttarakhand. Spanning about 5.3 acres, it handles over 1,800 buses a day.

== History ==
Maharana Pratap ISBT became operational in 1976. It served as the only ISBT in Delhi till 1993 when it was transferred to the Transport Department, whereafter two new ISBTs were constructed in Sarai Kale Khan and Anand Vihar to de-congest the overcrowded Maharana Pratap ISBT. It was renovated in 2011–2012 by DIMTS at a cost of ₹ 70 crores, and inaugurated in 2013 by then Chief Minister of Delhi, Sheila Dikshit.

== Services ==
The terminus has 45 departure bus bays, eight idle bus bays, and 13 arrival bus bays, all catering to interstate buses or buses to other ISBTs in Delhi. City bus services, operated by the Delhi Transport Corporation (DTC), run from the section known as the DTC Block.

It primarily serves the following scheduled bus services:

- Inter-state: Haryana, Western Uttar Pradesh, Chandigarh, Punjab Himachal Pradesh (including popular destinations like Shimla, Manali, Kullu), Uttarakhand, Jammu and Kashmir, Ladakh, and Rajasthan (northwestern Bagar region and western Thar Desert).
- Local connectivity within Delhi NCR: provides direct connectivity to other ISBTs in Delhi via DTC buses.

== Facilities ==
The departure block, waiting area, and food court are centrally air-conditioned. Reverse osmosis plants have been installed to supply clean drinking water to the passengers. A high-speed, secured Wi-Fi zone provide passengers internet connectivity. To keep the structure environmentally-friendly, a sewage treatment plant has been installed with the capacity of 1000 cubic meters per day. The sewage water is treated and recycled to be used in the air-conditioning plant and for the purpose of horticulture and flushing toilets. A new parking management system has also been developed that is capable of storing data of buses entering and exiting the premises. High-resolution CCTV cameras have also been installed for surveillance.

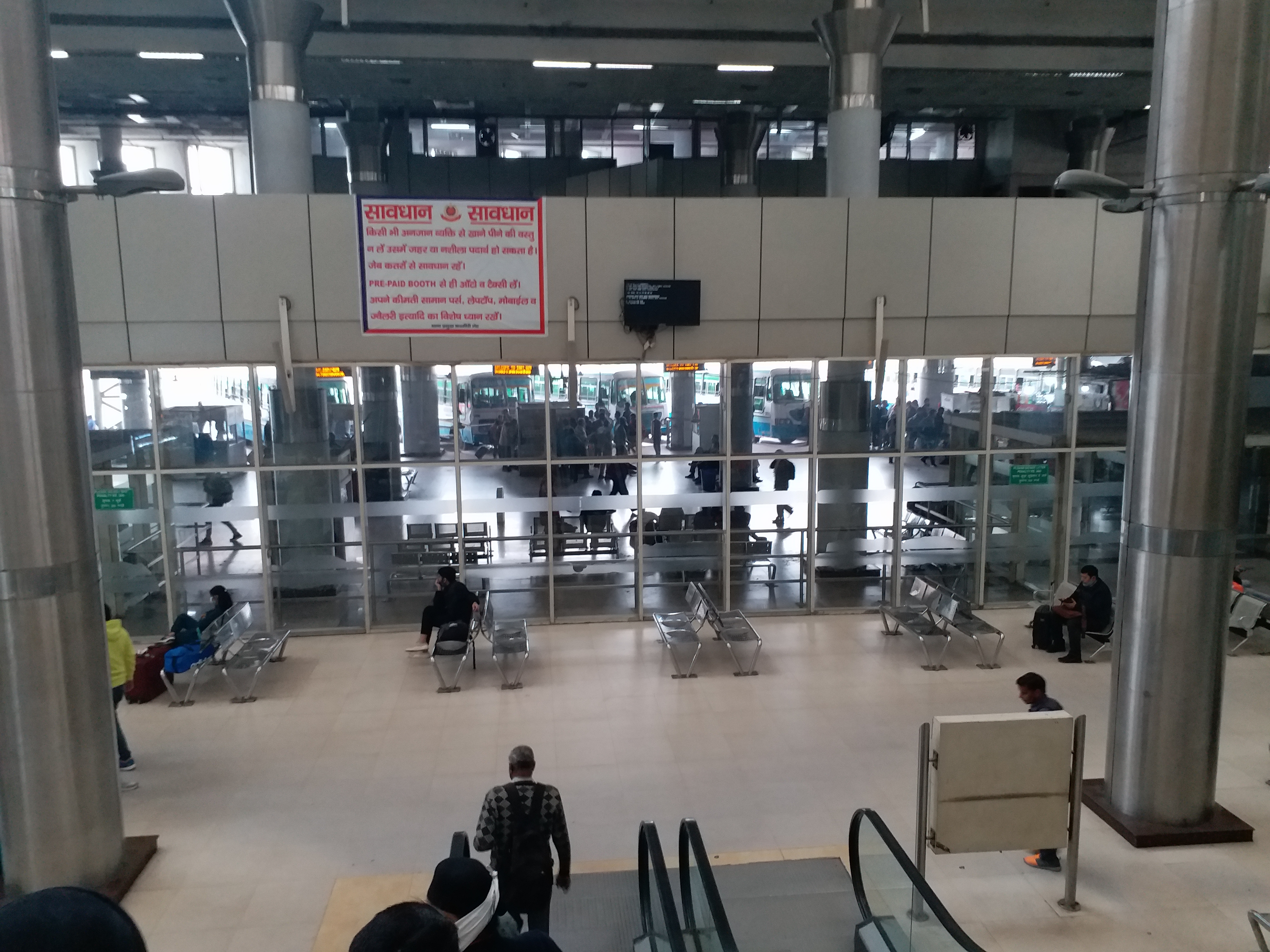
Maharana Pratap ISBT sitting space

== See also ==
- Transport in Delhi
- Sarai Kale Khan Inter-State Bus Terminus
- Kashmere Gate metro station
- Inter-State Bus Terminals
- Swami Vivekanand Inter State Bus Terminus
