= Jio Financial Services =

Indian financial company

Jio Financial Services Limited
- Formerly: Reliance Strategic Investments Private Limited (1999–2002); Reliance Strategic Investments Limited (2002–2023)
- Type: Public
- Traded as: BSE: 543940; NSE: JIOFIN; NSE NIFTY 50 constituent
- ISIN: INE758E01017
- Founded: 22 July 1999; 27 years ago
- Founder: Mukesh Ambani
- Headquarters: Mumbai, Maharashtra
- Area served: India
- Key people: K. V. Kamath; Rajiv Mehrishi
- Subsidiaries: Allianz Jio Reinsurance; Jio Finance; Jio Insurance Broking; Jio Payment Solutions; Jio Leasing Services; Jio Payments Bank (100%)
- Website: www.jfs.in www.jiofinance.in

Jio Financial Services Limited (JFSL) is an Indian financial services company, based in Mumbai. Originally a subsidiary of Reliance Industries (RIL), it was demerged as an independent entity and listed on the Indian stock exchanges in August 2023.

The company provides financial services, including payment services and insurance broking. Its subsidiary Jio Finance holds an NBFC license from the RBI. Another subsidiary, Jio Payments Bank, is also a payments bank registered in India.

== History ==
Jio Financial Services was initially a financial services subsidiary of Reliance Industries. In July 2023, it was spun-off via a demerger, with shareholders of Reliance Industries receiving one equity share of Jio Financial Services for every share they held in Reliance. Reliance Industries transferred ₹15,500 crore (US$1.6 billion) of cash and liquid investments to Jio Financial Services as part of the demerger scheme. This gave Jio Financial Services a liquid asset base of ₹20,700 crore (US$2.1 billion).

JFSL was listed on the stock exchanges on 21 August 2023. Following the demerger and listing, JFSL was briefly a part of Nifty 50, BSE SENSEX and FTSE indices, but was removed from these indices over the following weeks as it did not meet their inclusion criteria.

In July 2023, JFSL entered the asset management company (AMC) business, by forming a 50:50 joint venture with BlackRock called Jio BlackRock. In April 2024, JFSL and BlackRock announced a partnership in wealth management and broking business.

In May 2024, JFSL launched JioFinance, an app with digital payments, loans and insurance offerings.

In March 2026, the reinsurance service “Allianz Jio Reinsurance Limited,” operated jointly with Allianz, began operations.

In August 2026, Jio Financial Services entered into a joint venture agreement with Bank of America, which agreed to invest ₹18,268 crore to acquire up to a 49.9% stake in its subsidiary, Jio Credit Limited.

== Controversies ==
=== Related party transactions ===
In 2024, Jio Financial Services established a subsidiary called Jio Leasing Services Ltd, an unrelated leasing services business. The subsidiary signed a $4.4 billion deal with another promoter-owned company, Reliance Retail for leasing routers.
