= More Card =

Public transit smart card used in India

- Location: Delhi, India
- Launched: 2011
- Successor: National Common Mobility Card
- Currency: INR (INR 1,000 maximum load)
- Credit expiry: None
- Auto recharge: Automatic top up
- Website: http://www.travelwithmore.com

More Card is a contactless smart card for paying transportation fares in public transport systems in India. Tipped as a nationwide interoperable transport card, the card aims to be a single point of transaction, applicable in state buses, Metro and even parking. The card was launched in 2012 in Delhi, initially acting as a common card for the Delhi Metro and its feeder buses.

== Name and logo ==
The brand name More has been chosen to signify the national bird peacock (in Hindi & related Indian languages - such as those using the Devanagari script - मोर [mor] means peacock) as also literally, to convey that you get more and more by using this card. The logo of the card is an illustration of peacock.

== History ==
In a move to aid commuter convenience, and to mitigate its cash handling pains, BEST, adopted a new alternative method of paying for bus fares. From January 2007, the multi-application card system called GO Mumbai card was made available to the desired commuters. The purpose of the "Go Mumbai" card was to have a uniform currency for various kinds of transactions like paying tolls, paying for fuel, payments at railway canteens, etc. The GO Mumbai card scheme was introduced by Kaizen Automation Pvt Ltd in April 2008. The card intended to help users travel in Brihanmumbai Electric Supply and Transport (BEST) buses and local trains.

The card, launched first for BEST buses, was later extended to Central and Western Railway services and promised to be a transport card for seamless connectivity in Mumbai. While BEST conductors were provided with hand-held devices to validate the cards, Go Mumbai devices were installed at all railway stations. There were also plans to extend it to toll collection, taxis and autos. The railways' efforts to popularise the GO Mumbai card scheme proved futile. But the dreams crashed after Kaizen Limited, the company involved in the project, failed to supply enough number of hand-held devices to check the card's validity. Another reason for its failure was that the commuters did not find it easy to use. According to railway officials, of the 37 lakh commuters who travel every day by CR, only 12,000 used the Go Mumbai card. Of the 33 lakh commuters on WR, only 39 used it. The BEST and railways have decided to do away with the 'Go Mumbai ticketing' smart card by the end of 2010. The State Bank of India that was the payment operator between the railways and Kaizen had expressed willingness to do the project but was given up later.

With the failure of the Go Mumbai card, The National Urban Transport Policy has envisaged a common mobility card — a single ticketing card for public transport — that can be used anywhere in the country. It can be used on national, state, and city modes of transit and will have a common framework. “For rolling out a common mobility card and an automatic fare-collection system across India, it is important to have national standard specifications so that various systems can be integrated seamlessly,” said S.K. Lohia, officer on special duty (urban transport), in the central ministry of urban development. He has written to all public transport undertakings in the country, including the chairman of the railway board and operators of the metro and monorail systems. A company owned by the finance ministry has already embarked on the project following guidelines by the Reserve Bank of India. This national common mobility card (NCMC), named 'More', was unveiled by Union Urban Development Minister Kamal Nath by December 2011 and was expected to take five years before the card becomes operational throughout the country.

The implementation of 'More' was decided to be partly funded by the Central government under the JNNURM scheme covering the buses sanctioned under it. To roll out the card on an all-India basis to ensure the standardisation of the NCMC, UTI Infrastructure Technology and Services Limited has been appointed as the technology aggregator to implement the project. An agreement was signed with the Jaipur City Transport Services Limited and the card will be operational in buses across Rajasthan's state capital by March 2012. The Karnataka State Road Transport Corporation and Bhopal Municipal Corporation were also at an advance stage of entering into an agreement. In Mumbai, to begin with, these cards may be issued to those having monthly passes.

== More Delhi ==
The More Delhi card was available for sale from August 2012 and can be used both in the Delhi Metro and feeder buses. Like the Delhi Metro smart card, the More card can be purchased from Rs 50 onwards. The government is planning to integrate it with Delhi Transport Corporation (DTC) as well. Incidentally, the More card is designed to be used across the country. In Delhi NCR region it can be used in Metro, DMRC run feeder buses and would have the future provision of use in DTC and Cluster Buses run by DIMTS. This is first such card in India. The card was launched for use by commuters in Metro and 10 DMRC run Feeder Buses on route no ML 5 & 56 plying from Shastri Park Metro station to Mayur Vihar Phase III via Akshardham, NOIDA Link Road, Mayur Vihar Phase I, Dharamshila Cancer Hospital, Vasundhara Enclave.

== More Mumbai ==
The Mumbai Metropolitan Region Development Authority has conducted a meeting for initiating National Common Mobility Card (NCMC), which has been launched by the Union Ministry of Urban Development for cashless travel across the city. UTI Infra will offer MMRDA and other transit and para-transit corporations various services to implement unified ticketing solutions to avoid the repeated inconvenience of small cash transactions. The unified card will be called ‘More Mumbai.’ Top officials of the railways, bus transport corporations and municipal corporations attended the meeting convened by MMRDA for the purpose.

== Card usage ==
More cards can be used in the same way as any other smart cards to enter and exit Metro stations, by tapping on or holding within an inch of the designated space on the automatic fare collection (AFC) gates. Delhi metro Rail Corporation (DMRC) launched online recharge for its smart card users. This facility is being introduced in order to make services more and more automated and reduce manpower and associated problems. It is launched in association with ICICI Bank as the gateway provider. Currently, the payment can be done with only debit and credit cards but soon the other net banking facilities will also be provided. The users can log on to www.dmrcsmartcard.com to get the recharge done with a minimum amount of INR 100 and maximum INR 1,000 per card. Multiple smart cards can also be recharged by a single user. However to complete the process, users will have to physically validate their recharge by using the Add Value Machine (AVM). Add value machine is a touch screen based machine which provides information about the amount available and the last recharge done. For now, around 39 AVM's are being installed in 13 metro stations.
