= Vivek Bhandari =

Indian professor

- Born: 4 March 1970 (age 56)
- Known for: Director of Institute of Rural Management, Anand

Vivek Bhandari is an Indian academic. From 2007 to 2011, he served as Director of the Institute of Rural Management Anand (IRMA), a premier management school located in India. Bhandari was one of the youngest business school directors in India when he took over this responsibility, and during his tenure IRMA's research impacted policy at the national level in a variety of fields related to rural development. As a result, the institute also received national and international recognitions under his leadership, most notably from the Canadian agency, the International Development Research Centre (IDRC), as well as ministries in the Government of India. He is now on the faculty of Krea University.

== Early life ==
Bhandari spent his early years in various parts of Rajasthan (India). He completed his BA and MA in History from St. Stephen's College, Delhi. He went on to do a second Master's in South Asian Studies at the University of Pennsylvania, Philadelphia, USA, and proceeded to complete his doctorate from the same university.

== Career ==
After completing his education, Bhandari became a faculty member at Hampshire College in Amherst, MA, in the USA. In this capacity, he also taught and researched at academic institutions in the Five College Consortium (which includes Amherst College, Smith College, Mount Holyoke College, and the University of Massachusetts, Amherst) located in Massachusetts, USA. In 2007, he returned to India as director of the Institute of Rural Management Anand (IRMA).

In 2010, Bhandari was a visiting scholar at the Center for the Advanced Study of India at the University of Pennsylvania. From 2013 to 2018, he served as Ratan Tata Chair (Visiting) Professor at the Tata Institute of Social Sciences, Mumbai. He was also a founding faculty member of the Young India Fellowship Program (associated with Ashoka University) in New Delhi.

From 2011 to 2015, Bhandari worked as a consultant to philanthropic trusts such as the Sir Dorabji Tata Trust, Sir Ratan Tata Trust, and the Reliance Foundation. He was affiliated with the World Economic Forum's Global Shapers Program from 2012 to 2014. Since late 2017, he has been serving as an Advisory Council member of the Copenhagen Consensus Center.

Over the years, Bhandari has held appointments at the Johns Hopkins Bloomberg School of Public Health (Baltimore), the Indian School of Business (Hyderabad), and IIHMR University (Jaipur); and taught at the National Institute of Design (Ahmedabad).

Since 2017, Bhandari has been serving as chairman/independent director of the Jio Payments Bank Limited, a joint-venture of the State Bank of India and Reliance Industries Limited.

Bhandari's writings have been published in the Journal of Asian Studies, Comparative Studies of South Asia, Africa, and the Middle East, in edited volumes, and reference works such as the International Encyclopedia for the Social Sciences and the Encyclopedia of Modern Asia. He is a co-author of the "State of Panchayats Report: An Independent Assessment, 2007-08," which was commissioned by the Government of India and was India's first macro-study of institutions of local self-governance in India (called Gram Panchayat). The study allowed him to explore his particular interest in the study of grassroots development, social mobilizations and community organizations in India.

== Recognition ==
A year into his term as director of IRMA in 2008, Bhandari was included in Business Today magazine's list of India's Top Twenty-Five Young Executives under the age of 40.
