= Fino Payments Bank =

Indian Payments Bank

- Type: Public
- Traded as: NSE: FINOPB; BSE: 543386
- Industry: Banking
- Founded: 2007
- Headquarters: Navi Mumbai, Maharashtra, India
- Number of locations: 71 branches
- Key people: Ketan Merchant (interim MD & CEO)
- Products: Payments, deposits, remittances and digital banking
- Parent: Fino PayTech Limited
- Website: www.fino.bank

Fino Payments Bank is an Indian payments bank headquartered in Navi Mumbai, Maharashtra. It was established as a payments bank subsidiary of Fino PayTech Limited and commenced operations on 30 June 2017 after receiving a licence from the Reserve Bank of India.

== History ==
Fino Payments Bank originated from Fino PayTech, a financial technology company established to provide technology-enabled financial inclusion services.

In September 2015, the RBI granted Fino PayTech in-principle approval to establish a payments bank as part of the first group of entities approved under India's payments bank licensing framework.

The RBI granted final approval to Fino Payments Bank to conduct payments bank business on 30 March 2017. The bank commenced operations on 30 June 2017.

== Initial public offering and listing ==
Fino Payments Bank launched its initial public offering (IPO) in October 2021. The issue consisted of a fresh issue of shares worth ₹300 crore and an offer for sale of shares held by its promoter, Fino PayTech, with a total offer size of approximately ₹1,200 crore.

The IPO was priced at ₹560–577 per share and was subscribed approximately two times.

The company's shares were subsequently listed on the National Stock Exchange of India and BSE Limited in November 2021.

== Transition to small finance bank ==
In December 2025, Fino Payments Bank has received in-principle approval from the RBI to transform into a small finance bank, a first for any payments bank. This move will enable Fino to commence lending activities, expand its offerings, and strengthen its deposit base.
