= India Post Payments Bank =

Indian public sector payments bank

- Type: Division of Indian Post
- Industry: Financial services
- Founded: 30 January 2017; 9 years ago
- Headquarters: New Delhi, India
- Area served: India
- Key people: Vineet Pandey, IPoS (Secretary, Department of Posts); R. Viswesvaran, CEO & MD
- Products: Banking
- Services: Financial Services
- Owner: India Post, Department of Post, Ministry of Communications, Government of India
- Website: ippbonline.bank.in

India Post Payments Bank (IPPB) is an Indian state-owned payment bank headquartered in New Delhi. It is a division of India Post under the ownership of the Department of Post, within the Ministry of Communications of the Government of India. Opened in 2018, as of March 31 2026, the bank has over 13.25 crore customers.. Also, the bank reported deposits of ₹29,104 crores.

The bank is wholly owned by the Government of India. And also as per norms, IPPB is coming up with an Initial Public Offer (IPO) soon.

== History ==
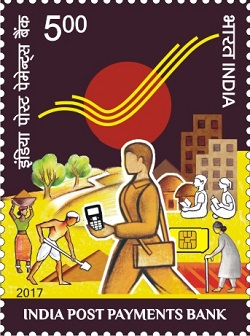
A postage stamp released during the launch of India Post Payments Bank in 2017.

On 19 August 2015, India Post received a license to run a payments bank from the Reserve Bank of India. On 17 August 2016, it was registered as a public limited government company for setting up a payments bank. IPPB is operating with the Department of Posts under the Ministry of Communications.

The pilot project of IPPB was inaugurated on 30 January 2017 at Raipur and Ranchi. In August 2018, the Union Cabinet approved the cost of Rs. 14.35 billion for setting up the bank. The first phase of the bank, with 650 branches and 3,250 post offices as access points, was inaugurated on 1 September 2018. Over ten thousand postmen have been roped into the first phase. By September 2020, the bank had acquired about 35 million customers. The bank had acquired about 40 million customers by December 2020. In August 2025, India Post Payments Bank crossed the 12 crore customers mark along with ₹20,000 crore deposits.

== Operations ==
The Bank operates through one controlling branch and 649 banking outlets, providing a physical across nearly every district in India. Its infrastructure leverages over 136,000 post offices including 22,251 Head and Sub Post Offices as services access points across urban and rural areas. On-ground doorstep banking services are facilitated by a field workforce of over 200,000 postmen and Gramin Dak Sevaks.

== Services ==
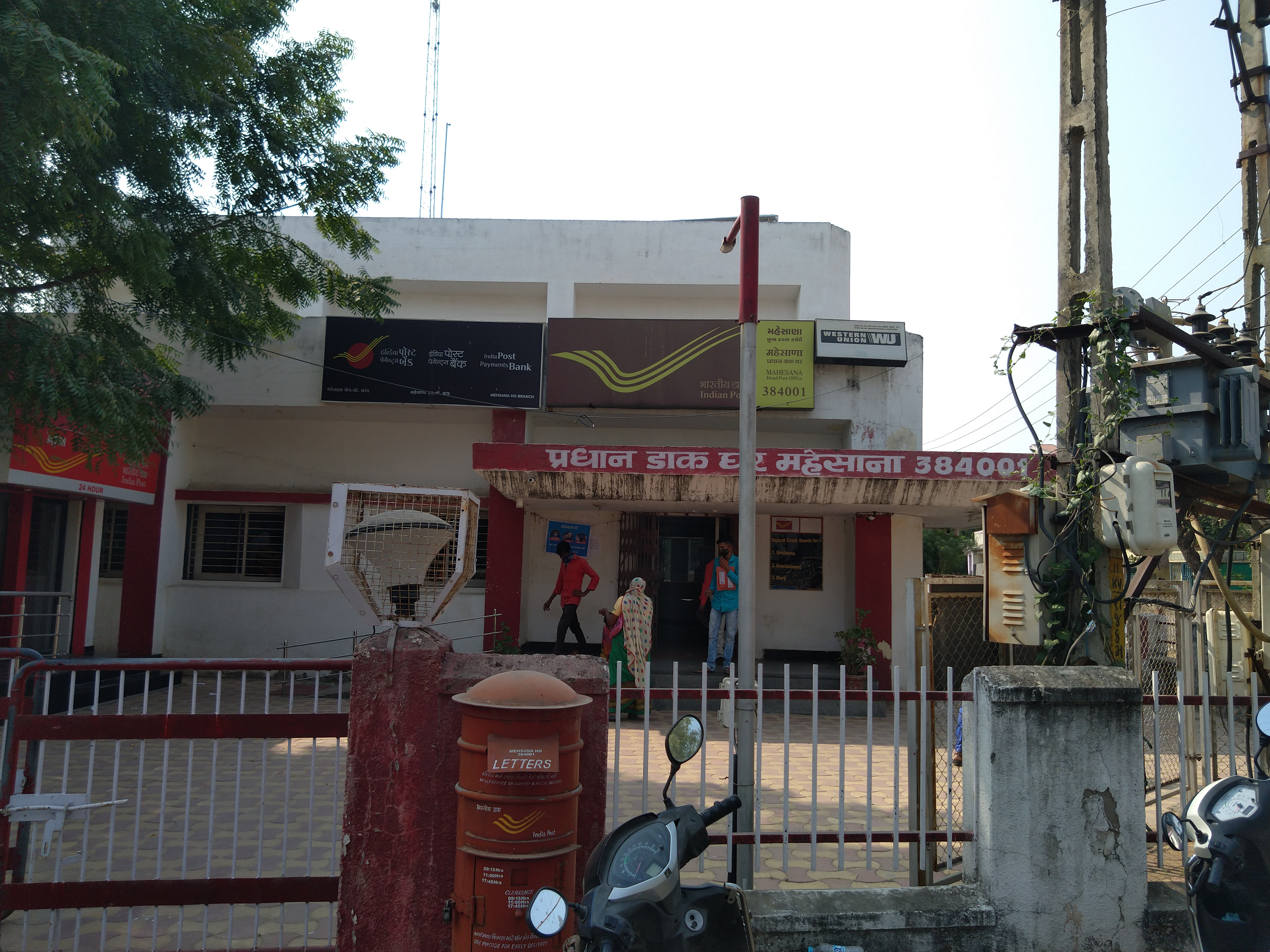
IPPB branch at the Head Post Office in Mehsana

IPPB aims to utilize all of India's 155,015 post offices as access points and 300,000 postmen and Grameen Dak Sewaks to provide doorstep banking services.

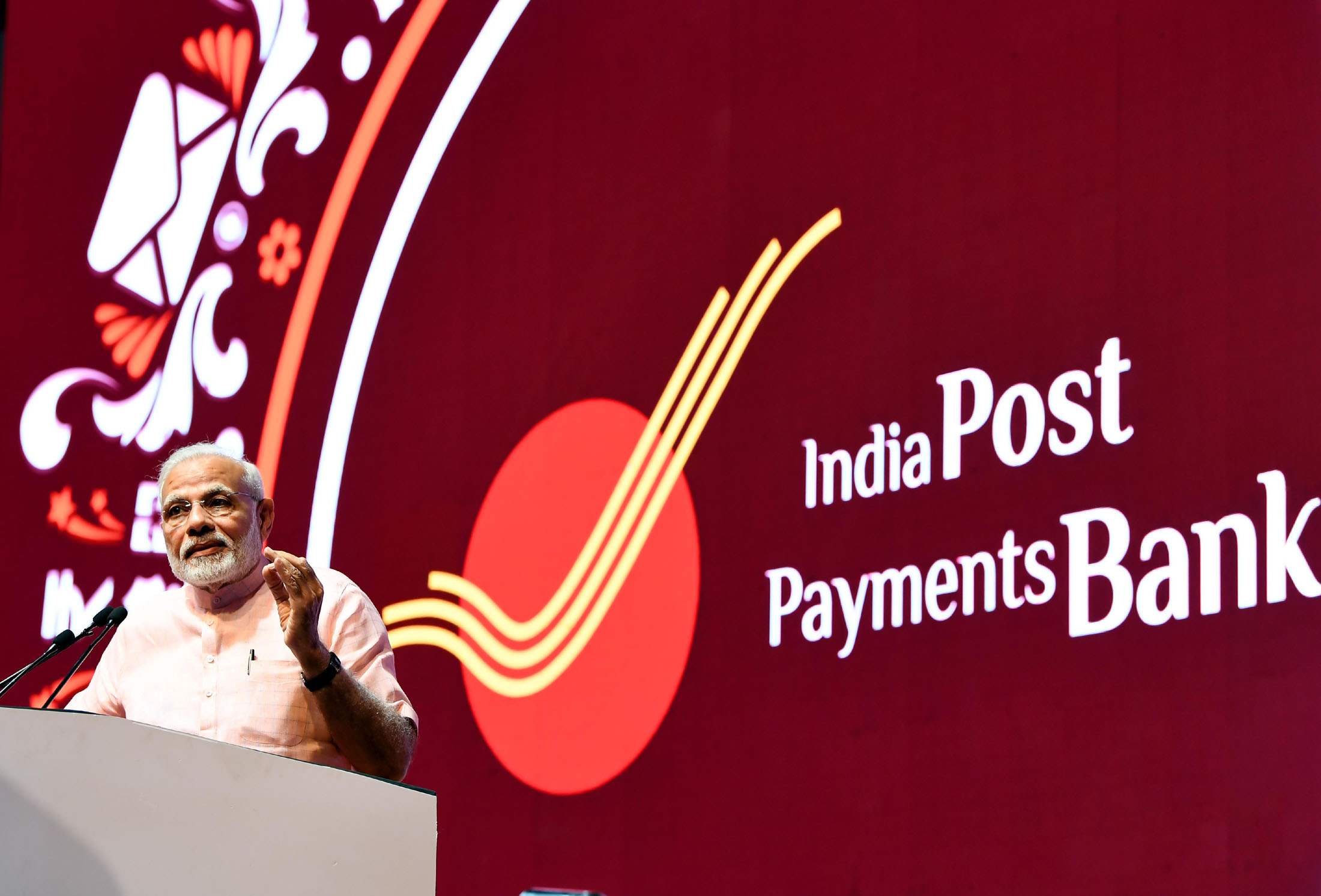
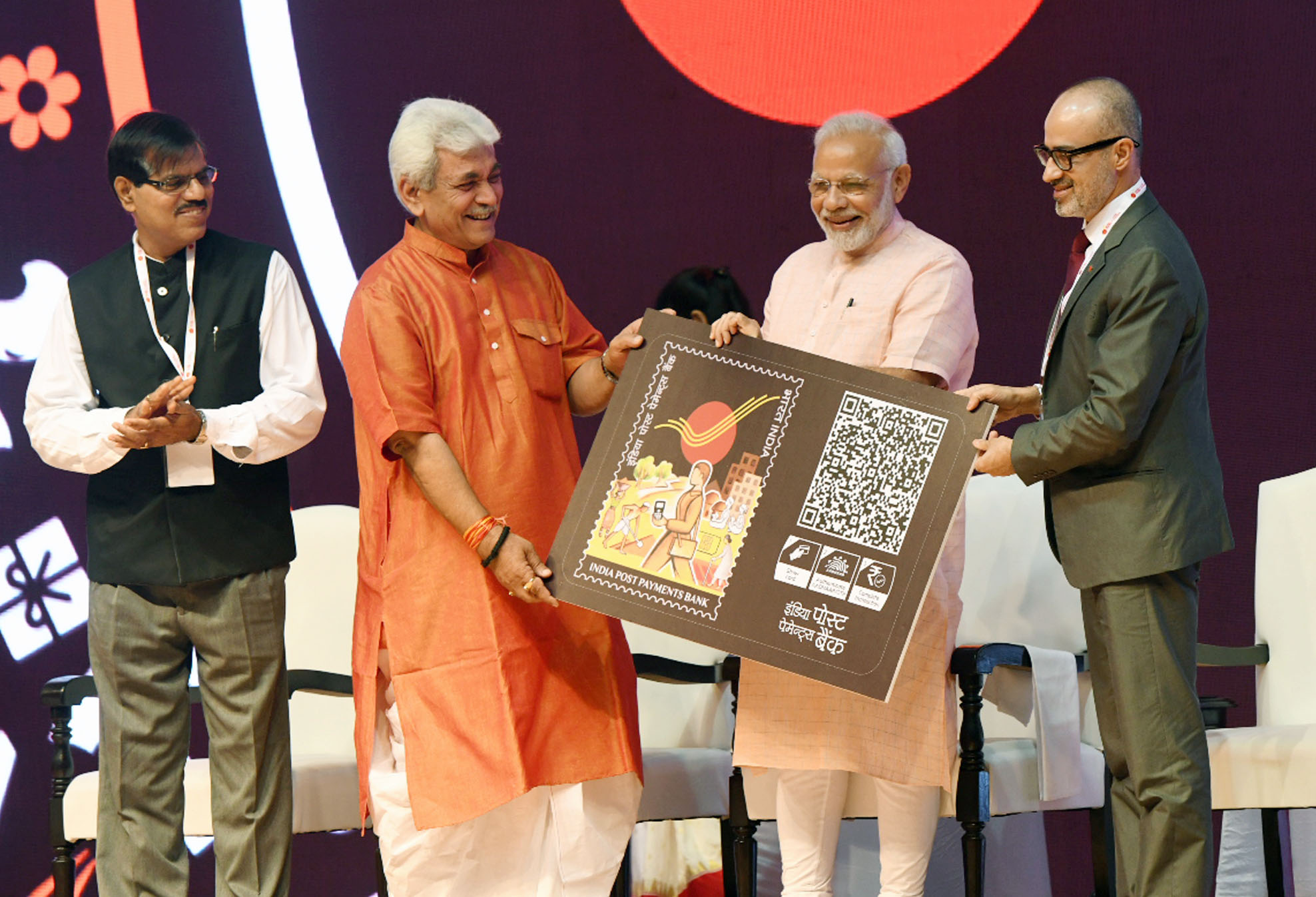
The Prime Minister of India, Narendra Modi, at the launch of the India Post Payments Bank, in New Delhi on 1 September 2018. The Minister of State for Communications (I/C) Manoj Sinha, the Secretary (Post), Ananta Narayan Nanda and IPPB CEO and MD. Suresh Sethi are also seen.

IPPB offers savings accounts, money transfer and insurance through third parties, bill and utility payments.

The bank also provides features like:

- Account: The bank offers savings and current accounts up to a balance of Rs. 200,000.
- QR Code: Customers can use QR code payments eliminating the need to remember account numbers, PINs and passwords.
- Unified Payments Interface
- Immediate Payment Service
- National Electronic Funds Transfer
- Real-time gross settlement
- Bharat BillPay
- Direct Benefit Transfer
- RuPay Debit Card
- AEPS (Aadhaar Enabled Payment Service)

IPPB has been allowed to link around 170 million postal savings bank (PSB) accounts with its accounts.

== See also ==
- Payments bank
- Poste italiane
