= Aditya Birla Payments Bank =

Indian bank

- Company type: Private
- Industry: Financial services
- Founded: 19 February 2016
- Defunct: 26 July 2019
- Fate: Closed (2019)
- Headquarters: Mumbai, India
- Key people: Dev Bhattacharya (Non-Executive Director); Sudhakar Ramasubramanian (MD & CEO)
- Products: Savings Account, BHIM ABPB UPI, ABPB Wallet, ABPB Payments Gateway
- Services: Banking, Payments & Payments Systems, UPI, NEFT, IMPS, Third Party Loan Referral, Digital wallet, Group Insurances
- Parent: Grasim Industries Limited (51%); Idea Cellular Limited (49%)
- Website: www.adityabirla.bank

Aditya Birla Payments Bank Limited (ABPB) was a payments bank started as a joint venture by Aditya Birla Nuvo Ltd. and Idea Cellular. Launched on 22 February 2018, it is the fourth payments bank to begin operations since issuance of licenses to 11 firms by the Reserve Bank of India in August 2015.

On 20 July 2019, Aditya Birla Payments Bank announced that it would be shutting down operations subject to the receipt of requisite regulatory consents and approval.

== History ==
Aditya Birla Nuvo (now Grasim Industries Limited) was one of the 11 entities to receive an in-principle approval by Reserve Bank of India (RBI) to set-up payments banks in India, in August 2015. Post the in-principle approval, RBI had issued a license to Aditya Birla Payments Bank under Section 22 (1) of the Banking Regulation Act, 1949 to commence with the business of payments bank in April 2017.

Aditya Birla Payments Bank earlier operated as IMCSL (Idea Mobile Commerce Services Ltd) as a brand of Idea Cellular Ltd.

Aditya Birla Nuvo Limited holds 51 percent shares while the remaining 49 percent are with Idea Cellular.

Aditya Birla Payments Bank, which was a joint venture between Aditya Birla Nuvo and Idea Cellular, discontinued its banking business within 2 years of its inceptions due to lack of funds.
