= Jaipur City Transport Services Limited =

City bus service for Jaipur, India

- Parent: Rajasthan State Road Transport Corporation
- Founded: February 6, 2008; 18 years ago
- Headquarters: Jaipur, Rajasthan, India
- Locale: Jaipur
- Service area: Jaipur, Sanganer, Amber, Neendor, Bassi
- Service type: Low floor, Semi low floor, Mini bus, A/C
- Routes: 29
- Depots: Bagrana depot; Todi depot
- Fleet: 200
- Daily ridership: 125,000
- Fuel type: Diesel, CNG
- Website: transport.rajasthan.gov.in

Jaipur City Transport Services Limited (JCTSL) is a city bus service for Jaipur, the capital of Rajasthan state in India. It is operated by RSRTC.

== History ==
The system has been running from many years, but was heavily modified in 2007. RSRTC extended travelling facility to the colonies and sub-urban towns in and around Jaipur. Bus service was initially only on the main roads, but it later operated in residential areas too. Now it also operates in congested areas. JCTSL was established to cater the increasing needs of Jaipur City.RSRTC covered travelling facility to the colonies, urban, sub-urban town, historical places, and tourist places and around Jaipur.

== Passenger amenities ==
To solve the transportation problems of Jaipur, new buses were introduced recently by JCTSL. Millions of passengers with a view to facilitate the city (JCTSL) take the floor on Thursday, 10 bus routes "Jaipur just" the pilot began.Regardless of the heavy financial loss on the system, RSRTC has been operating about 300 city buses per day. For late night passengers, selected city night service buses connecting to the local railway station and the Bus Stand have also been operated by RSRTC. Recently it also inaugurated its HOP-ON HOP-OFF service for attracting foreign tourists. The process of development and expansion of the system to the commuters is a regular process in RSRTC and RSRTC is expediting its responsibility. For declaring its public responsibility, Jaipur City Transport Services has been published for better transparency and accountability..

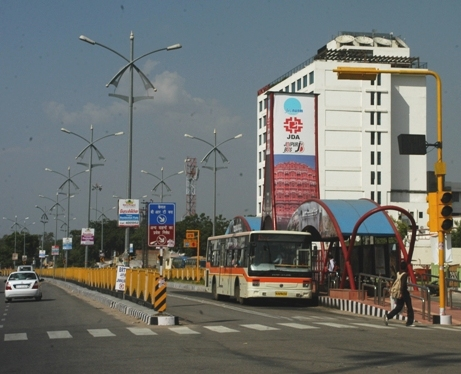
Jaipur BRTS
