= Payments bank =

New model of banks initiative by Reserve Bank of India

Payments banks are a new model of banks, conceptualised by the Reserve Bank of India (RBI), which cannot issue credit. These banks can accept a restricted deposit, which is currently limited to ₹200,000 per customer and may be increased further. These banks cannot issue loans and credit cards. Both current account and savings accounts can be operated by such banks. Payments banks can issue ATM cards or debit cards and provide online or mobile banking. Bharti Airtel set up India's first payments bank, Airtel Payments Bank.

== History ==
On 23 September 2013, Committee on Comprehensive Financial Services for Small Businesses and Low Income Households, headed by Nachiket Mor, was formed by the RBI. On 7 January 2014, the Nachiket Mor committee submitted its final report. Among its various recommendations, it recommended the formation of a new category of bank called payments bank. On 17 July 2014, the RBI released the draft guidelines for payment banks, seeking comments for interested entities and the general public. On 27 November, RBI released the final guidelines for payment banks.

In February 2015, RBI released the list of entities which had applied for a payments bank licence. There were 41 applicants. It was also announced that an external advisory committee (EAC) headed by Nachiket Mor would evaluate the licence applications. On 28 February 2015, during the presentation of the Budget it was announced that India Post will use its large network to run payments bank. The external advisory committee headed by Nachiket Mor submitted its findings on 6 July 2015. The applicant entities were examined for their financial track record and governance issues. On 19 August 2015, the Reserve Bank of India gave "in-principle" licences to 11 entities to launch payments banks. The "in-principle" license was valid for 18 months within which the entities must fulfil the requirements and they were not allowed to engage in banking activities within the period. The RBI will grant full licenses under Section 22 of the Banking Regulation Act, 1949, after it is satisfied that the conditions have been fulfilled.

March 2019 witness, Paytm account for over 19% of all mobile-banking transactions while Airtel's Payments Bank contributed more than 5% to the 867 million transactions made during the month. In contrast, State Bank of India (SBI), the largest lender in the country by assets, recorded 145 million transactions, accounting for under 17%.The only banks ahead of Airtel Payments Bank are SBI and the three largest private-sector banks – HDFC Bank, ICICI Bank and Axis Bank. Indeed, ICICI Bank saw close to 60 million mobile-banking transactions in March 2019 though it was just a whisker ahead of Airtel, with under 7% of the market. Paytm Payments Bank and Airtel Payments Bank together command over 88% of the deposits in payment banks in India in 2018.

According to the Reserve Bank of India's report on ‘Trend and progress of Banking in India 2017-2018', the payment banks reported losses in the financial year 2017-2018, after a weak performance in the FY 2016-17.

== Regulations ==
The minimum capital requirement is Rs.100 crore. For the first five years, the stake of the promoter should remain at least 40%. Foreign share holding will be allowed in these banks as per the rules for FDI in private banks in India. The voting rights will be regulated by the Banking Regulation Act, 1949. The voting right of any shareholder is capped at 10%, which can be raised to 26% by the Reserve Bank of India. Any acquisition of more than 5% will require approval of the RBI. The majority of the bank's board of directors should consist of independent directors, appointed according to RBI guidelines.

The bank should be fully networked from the beginning. The bank can accept utility bills. It cannot form subsidiaries to undertake non-banking activities. Initially, the deposits will be capped at ₹100,000 per customer, but it may be raised by the RBI based on the performance of the bank. Payment Banks are not permitted to lend to any person including their directors. 25% of its branches must be in the unbanked rural area. The bank must use the term "payments bank" in its name to differentiate it from other types of bank. The banks will be licensed as payments banks under Section 22 of the Banking Regulation Act, 1949, and will be registered as public limited company under the Companies Act, 2013.

== Banks ==
Bharti Airtel launched India's first payments bank named Airtel Payments Bank in January 2017. Paytm Payments Bank, India Post Payments Bank, Fino Payments Bank and Aditya Birla Payments Bank have also launched services.

Of the 41 applicants, the list of RBI approved for provisional payments bank licenses are:

1. Aditya Birla Nuvo Limited
2. Airtel M Commerce Services Limited
3. Cholamandalam Distribution Services Limited
4. India Department of Posts
5. Fino PayTech Limited
6. National Securities Depository Limited
7. Reliance Industries Limited (Jio)
8. Dilip Shanghvi (Sun Pharmaceuticals)
9. Paytm Payments Bank Limited
10. Tech Mahindra Limited
11. Vodafone m-pesa Limited

The following is the list of those who surrendered their license:

1. Cholamandalam Distribution Services Limited
2. Dilip Shanghvi
3. Tech Mahindra Limited

The following is the list of active payments banks:

1. Airtel Payments Bank
2. India Post Payments Bank
3. Fino Payments Bank
4. Jio Payments Bank
5. NSDL Payments Bank

The following is the list of defunct payments banks:

1. Aditya Birla Payments Bank (26 July 2019)
2. Vodafone m-pesa Limited
3. Paytm Payments Bank Limited

== Criticism ==
S. Kalyanasundaram has written that the payments bank model is unviable due to restriction from lending and rules for cash reserve ratio and statutory liquidity ratio which leaves very little space for generating income for the payments banks.

== See also ==
- Regional Rural Bank
- Banking in India
- Small finance bank
