= Jio Payments Bank =

Indian payments bank

Jio Payments Bank Limited
- Type: Subsidiary
- Industry: Financial services
- Founded: 3 April 2018; 8 years ago
- Founder: Mukesh Ambani
- Headquarters: Navi Mumbai, India
- Area served: India
- Key people: Vivek Bhandari (Chairperson); Vinod Easwaran (MD & CEO)
- Services: Banking; Payment bank; Digital wallet; Bank account
- Owner: Jio Financial Services (100%)
- Website: www.jiopayments.bank.in

Jio Payments Bank Limited is an Indian payments bank, it started operating in 2018 and is currently a subsidiary of Jio Financial Services, which was initially owned by Reliance Industries but was listed separately on stock exchanges in 2023.

== History ==
On 19 August 2015, Reliance Industries received a license to run a payments bank from the Reserve Bank of India under Section 22 (1) of the Banking Regulation Act, 1949. It then partnered with the State Bank of India and incorporated Jio Payments Bank Limited in November 2016. Initially, JPBL was a 70:30 partnership between Reliance Industries Limited and the State Bank of India.

On 10 November 2016, it registered as a public limited company to set up a payments bank. On 3 April 2018, Jio Payments Bank became the sixth payments bank to commence operations in India.

In March 2024, it was reported that they were working on releasing a soundbox product for merchants, which would allow them to be notified whenever a customer pays and scans the QR code on the box and then through UPI.

State Bank of India later on held a 17.80% stake in Jio Payments Bank. In June 2025, Jio Financial Services bought out SBI's stake, taking full ownership of the payments bank.

== Controversies ==
In October 2020, the Reserve Bank of India (RBI) imposed a penalty of ₹1 crore (US$103,843) on the bank for not applying for the re-appointment of Managing Director and CEO in time, under Section 35B of the Banking Regulation Act, 1949.
