= Rajasthan State Road Transport Corporation =

Public transport corporation in Rajasthan, India

- Parent: Department of Transport, Government of Rajasthan
- Founded: 1 October 1964; 61 years ago
- Headquarters: Jaipur, Rajasthan, India
- Service area: Rajasthan and neighboring states
- Service type: Bus
- Routes: 2230
- Depots: 52
- Fleet: 3708
- Daily ridership: 731000 per day
- Fuel type: Diesel & Electric
- Operator: Government of Rajasthan
- Website: rsrtconline.rajasthan.gov.in

Rajasthan State Road Transport Corporation (RSRTC) is a public transport company which provides bus services in the Indian state Rajasthan. It is headquartered in Jaipur, Rajasthan. The corporation was established by Government of Rajasthan on 1 October 1964 under the Road Transport Act 1950. RSRTC operates ordinary, express and deluxe services.

== Facilities ==
Other than CBS Jaipur On-line booking facility is available free of cost at RSRTC counter at Narayan Singh Circle Jaipur. For Member of Parliament, Legislative Assembly, Ladies and for Handicapped People RSRTC has reserved special quota seat in each service. At 27 major bus stands like Jaipur, Ajmer, Jodhpur, Kota, Bikaner, Udaipur, Delhi computerized reservation along with return ticket facility is available. Mineral water is provided to the passengers travelling in Air Conditioned and Deluxe Bus services between Delhi and Jaipur. Breakfast (Gold Line Services) is served to the passengers travelling in Air Conditioned and Deluxe Bus services between Delhi and Jaipur. Sleeper coaches (Gray line) are introduced in the long-distance night transit services like Jaipur, Udaipur, Ganganagar, Haridwar, Kota, Bikaner and Pilani.

== Network ==
RSRTC is connected to eleven nearby States/Union Territories viz. Madhya Pradesh, Uttar Pradesh, Punjab, Haryana, Gujarat, Uttarakhand, Himachal Pradesh, Jammu-Kashmir, Delhi and Chandigarh through its various types of services.

== Future Plans ==
For the coming year, RSRTC has identified the following Key Focus Area for the benefits of its passengers:

1. Re-Introduction of Rural Transport Service as a means to provide connectivity between different villages and Tehsils.
2. End-to-End implementation of ERP to ensure provision of real time data and information related to ticketing, vehicle location, vehicle maintenance and expected time of arrival and departure of vehicles.
3. Development of State-of-the-Art Bus stands at Jaipur and Jodhpur and provision of additional passenger amenities such as dormitories, food plaza, baby feeding room etc. at all major Bus Stands of RSRTC.
4. Proper maintenance of RSRTC buses on mission mode to ensure cleanness and comfort in RSRTC buses.
5. Revamping of the Central Control Room to ensure time bound grievance redressal of the complaints received through toll Free No 18002000103, Control Room Land line & Mobile and WhatsApp.

For the benefit of Corporation, RSRTC intends to introduce the following Additional Revenue Management (ARM) measures:

1. Increase in Operational Kilometers.
2. Introduction of Dynamic Pricing:
3. Introduction of a new contract model based on revenue sharing for Contract Vehicles
4. Introduction of Electric Vehicles on Revenue Sharing Model:
5. Modernization and development of Bus Stations and Satellite terminals on Success Fee Model
6. Modernization and Strengthening of Workshops
7. Implementation of Digital Advertising
8. Development of Bus Stops on PPP Mode

== Major Bus Depot ==
- Abu Road
- Ajmer
- Alwar
- Anoopgarh
- Banswara
- Baran, Rajasthan
- Barmer, Rajasthan
- Beawar
- Bharatpur, Rajasthan
- Bhilwara
- Bikaner
- Bundi
- Chittorgarh
- Churu, Rajasthan
- Dausa
- Didwana
- Delhi ISBT
- Dholpur
- Dungarpur
- Falna
- Hanumangarh
- Hindaun City
- Indore
- Sindhi Camp ISBT Jaipur
- Jaisalmer
- Jalore
- Jhalawar
- Jhunjhunu
- Jodhpur
- Karauli
- Khetri
- Kota, Rajasthan
- Kotputli
- Bharatpur, Rajasthan
- Matsya Nagar (Alwar)
- Nagaur
- Pali
- Phalodi
- Rajsamand
- Sardarshahar
- Sawai Madhopur
- Sikar
- Sirohi
- Sri Ganganagar
- Sri Madhopur
- Tijara
- Tonk
- Udaipur
- Vaishali Nagar (Jaipur)

== See also ==
- Jaipur City Transport Services Limited
