= Airtel Payments Bank =

Indian Payments Bank

Airtel Payments Bank Limited
- Airtel Payments Bank Logo
- Type: Subsidiary
- Industry: Financial services
- Founded: 11 April 2016; 10 years ago
- Headquarters: Bharti Crescent, 1, Nelson Mandela Road, Vasant Kunj, Phase II, New Delhi, Delhi - 110070
- Area served: India
- Key people: Anubrata Biswas (MD & CEO)
- Products: Banking; Retail Banking
- Revenue: ▲₹3,207 crore (US$330 million) (FY26)
- Net income: ▲₹109 crore (US$11 million) (FY26)
- Parent: Bharti Airtel
- Website: airtelpayments.bank.in

Airtel Payments Bank is an Indian payments bank with its headquarters in New Delhi. The company is a subsidiary of Bharti Airtel. On 5 January 2022, it was granted the scheduled bank status by the Reserve Bank of India under the second schedule of Reserve Bank of India Act, 1934.

== History ==
In 2015, eleven companies received In-principle approval from the Reserve Bank of India to set up Payments Bank under the guidelines for Licensing of Payments Bank.

On 11 April 2016, Airtel Payments Bank became the first company to receive the Payments Bank license from the Reserve Bank of India under Section 22 (1) of the Banking Regulation Act, 1949. Airtel Payments Bank started with an 80:20 partnership between Bharti Airtel and Kotak Mahindra Bank.

Bharti Airtel launched Airtel Payments Bank in September 2016 and went live with its pilot project in Rajasthan in November 2016. It was launched nationally in January 2017 to support the cashless revolution promised by the Government of India.

In August 2021, Kotak Mahindra Bank sold its stake to Bharti Enterprises. As of 31 December 2021, 99.9% equity capital of the Bank is owned by the Bharti Group of Companies. The bank turned profitable in the quarter ended 30 September 2021, with an annual revenue run rate of ₹1,000 crore.

In 2024, it was named among Fortune's Fintech Innovators Asia.

== Services ==
Airtel Payments Bank has 155 million users and serves them through its digital platform and a retail-based distribution network. The Bank has built a network of over 500,000 neighborhood banking points.

=== Digital payments ===
In September 2017, Airtel Payments Bank launched UPI enabled digital payments to facilitate secure digital payments. Customers need to link their bank accounts on BHIM before they can make UPI payments. For UPI-based payments and transfers, customers are not required to furnish their bank details to enable transactions.

Airtel Payment Bank allows users to make payments using "Airtel Thanks App" or USSD.

=== FASTag ===
Airtel Payments Bank launched the issuance of FASTag in November 2019, offline and online.

=== Airtel Safe Pay ===
In 2021, The Bank launched ‘Airtel Safe Pay’ that provides an additional layer of payment validation compared to the industry norm of two-factor authentication.

=== Insurance and pension ===
In July 2019, Airtel Payments Bank partnered with Bharti AXA General Insurance. Airtel Payments Bank and Bharti Axa Life Insurance have started to provide the government's insurance plan Pradhan Mantri Jeevan Jyoti Bima Yojana in August 2018. In 2019, Airtel Payments Bank started offering Atal Pension Yojana (a Government of India initiative) through its platform.

== Financials ==
The Bank's capital at its establishment was Rs 3,000 crore (US$441 million).

In 2018–19, Airtel Payments Bank reported a loss of ₹338 crore, while it registered a loss of ₹272 crore in the financial year 2017–18. In FY 20, its revenues rose 87% to ₹474 crore. It turned profitable in the quarter ended September 2021 and has achieved an annual revenue run rate of ₹1,000 crores.

In December 2021, money deposited with Airtel Payments Bank surged 75 per cent to ₹1,000 crore as compared to 2020. Total share capital infused till date is ₹2,348 crores as per financials.

== Legal challenges ==
The Unique Identification Authority of India (UIDAI) suspended Bharti Airtel and Airtel Payment Bank's licence for eKYC of Aadhar on 16 December 2017, following complaints from customers that their accounts were being opened without their consent. Some even received their LPG subsidies in their Airtel Payment Bank accounts. In March 2018, The Reserve Bank of India imposed a monetary penalty of ₹5 crore (₹50 million).

On 12 July 2018, Airtel Payments Bank received requisite approvals from the Reserved Bank of India and Unique Identification Authority of India (UIDAI) to resume on-boarding new customers using of Aadhaar-based e-KYC.

== See also ==
- Airtel Money - mobile payments brand of Airtel Africa
