= Punjab Roadways =

Public bus transport service

- Parent: Ministry Of Transport
- Founded: 1948
- Commenced operation: 1948
- Service area: North India
- Depots: 18
- Fleet: 1694
- Operator: Government of Punjab
- Chief executive: Rajiv Kumar Gupta, Director of State Transport and Managing Director
- Minister Responsible: Laljit Singh Bhullar, Minister of Transport
- Website: Punjab Roadways

Punjab Roadways is a public bus transport service under the Ministry of Transport of the Government of Punjab. It was founded in 1948. Established with an initial fleet of 13 buses, the organization expanded in the 1980s, peaking at 2,407 buses by 1985.

The agency has played a significant role in providing state transportation services, offering employment opportunities for drivers, conductors, and technicians, thereby contributing to the regional economy.

== History ==
Historical Challenges and Fleet Adjustments During the late 1980s and early 1990s, Punjab Roadways faced operational challenges due to civil unrest, including the loss of 38 buses to violence and subsequent curtailment of services, particularly during evening hours. A lack of regular vehicle replacement further deteriorated fleet conditions, resulting in a substantial number of overaged buses by the late 1990s. To counter this, the government initiated the addition of 1,100 new buses through Punjab State Bus Stand Management Company Ltd. (PUNBUS). However, only 534 buses were acquired by 1999 due to financial constraints. By 1999, Punjab Roadways was compelled to ground 150 aging buses, with further reductions in 2002, bringing the fleet count down significantly.

== PUNBUS ==
PUNBUS was established as a subsidiary to manage fleet expansion loans and modernize the infrastructure. In 2005-06, PUNBUS, through commercial loans, enabled the addition of 360 new buses deployed on routes managed by Punjab Roadways. These additions improved the operational efficiency and coverage of public transportation services across Punjab.

In 2023, Government of Punjab decided to merge 587 debt-free buses of PUNBUS to Punjab Roadways.

== Welfare schemes ==
Punjab Roadways offers concessional and free travel options to eligible groups, including students, elderly citizens, and individuals with disabilities. The government has subsidized these concessions to ensure accessible transport across demographics.
