= PEPSU Road Transport Corporation =

Bus operator in Punjab, India

- Parent: Government of Punjab
- Founded: 16 October 1956
- Headquarters: Nabha Road, Patiala, Punjab, India
- Service area: North India
- Service type: Express, Rocket Service, Rocket Premium
- Depots: 9
- Fleet: 931
- Fuel type: Diesel
- Managing Director: Bikramjit Singh Shergill
- Website: www.pepsuonline.com

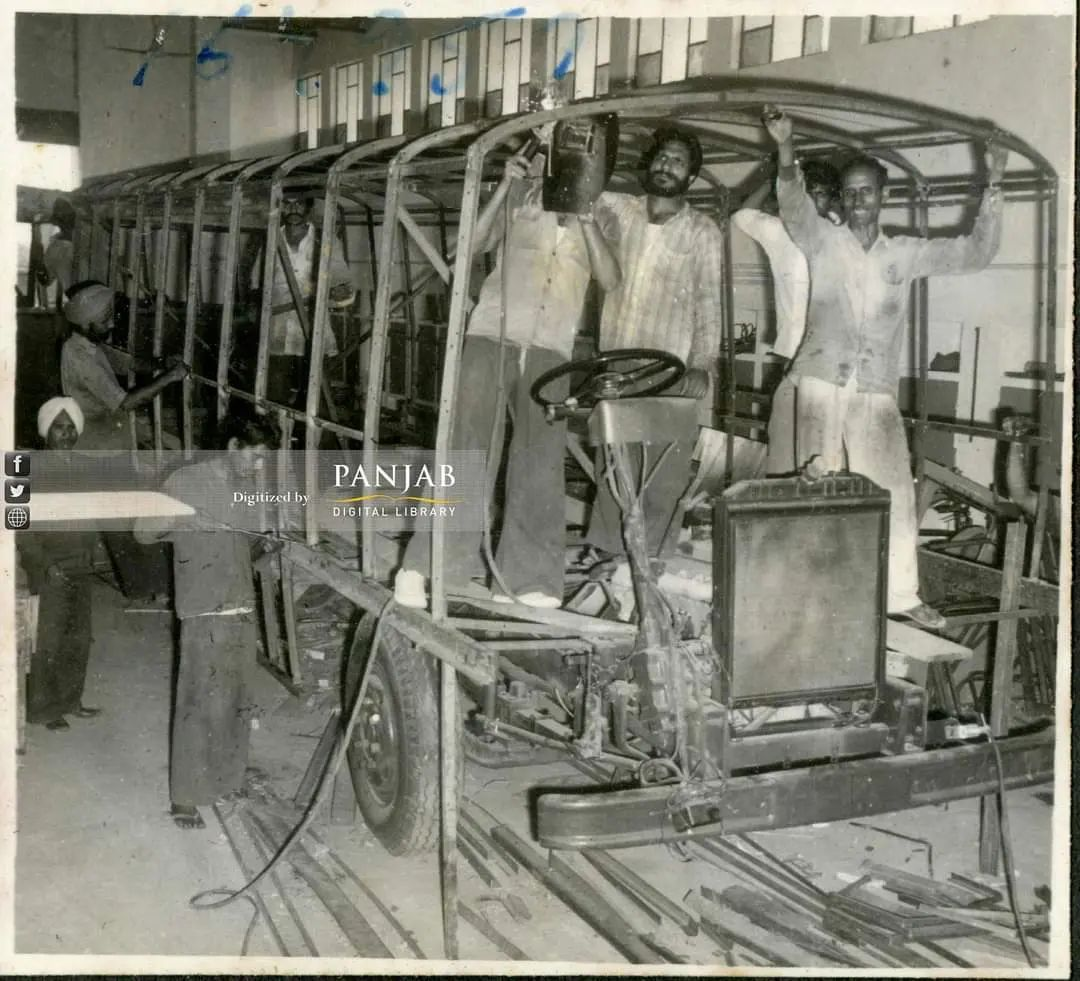
Construction of Buses by workers in the PEPSU (PRTC) Workshop, c.1960s. Panjab Digital Library.

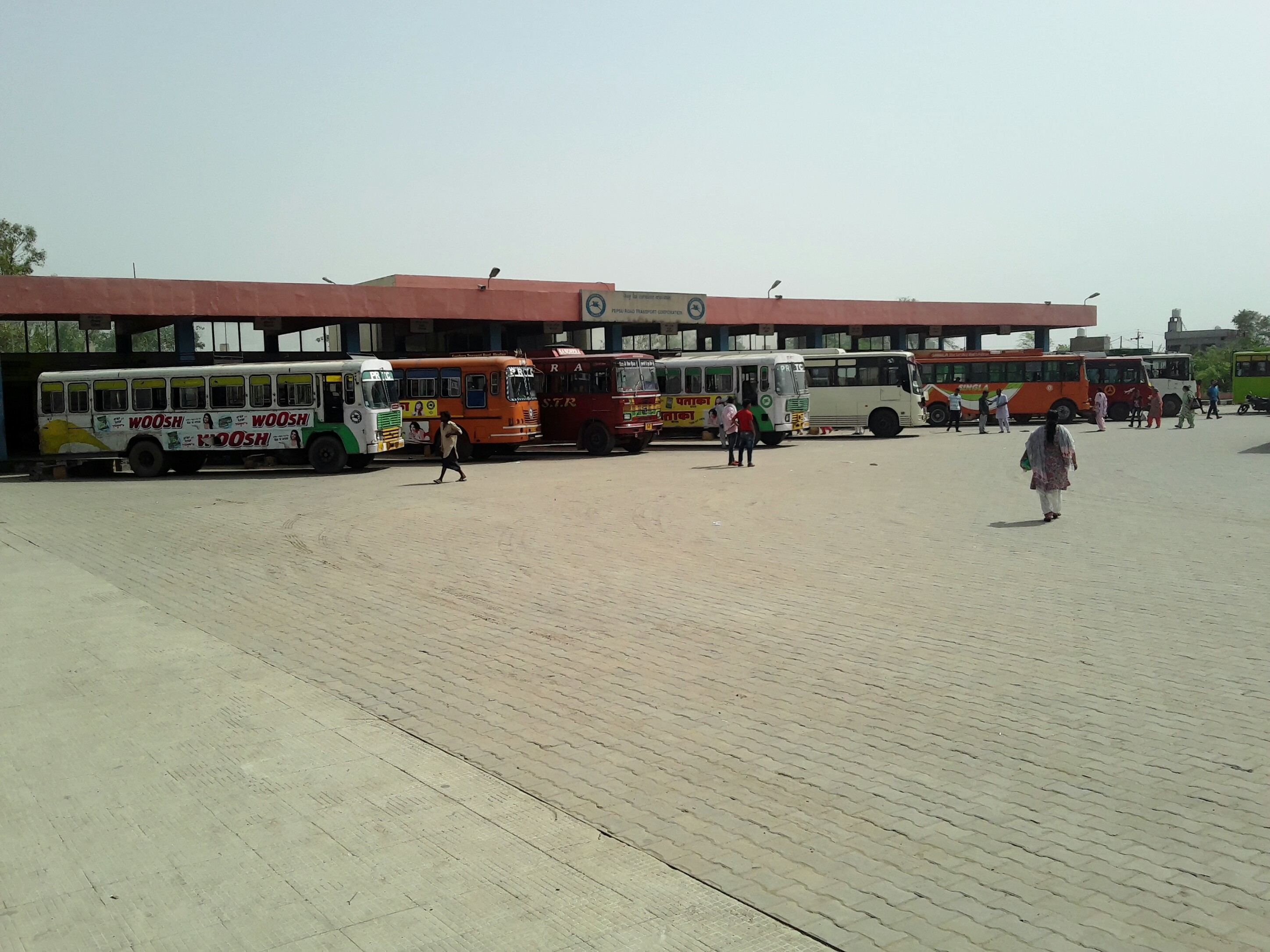
PRTC Bus Station at Budhlada, Mansa, Punjab

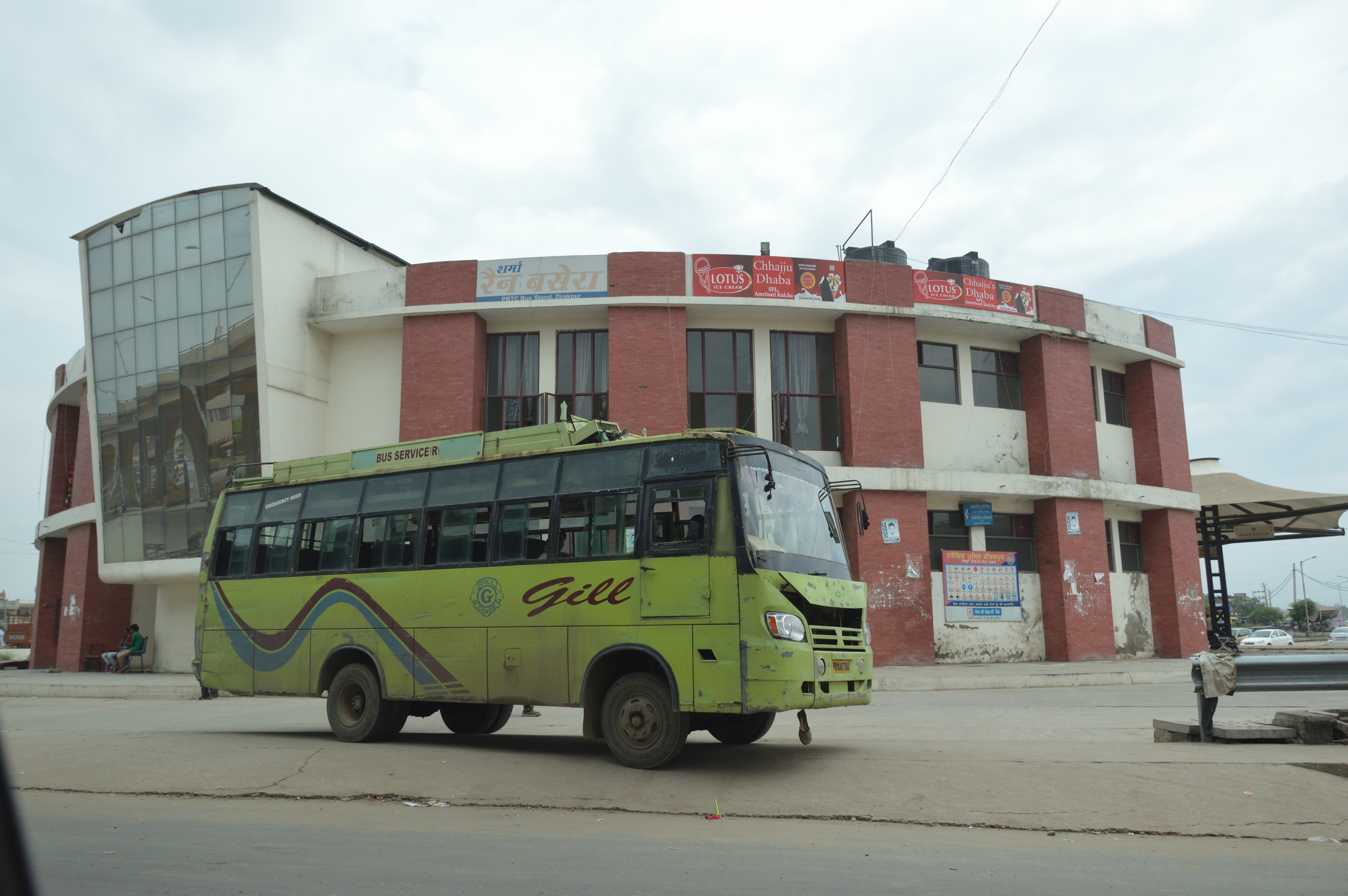
PRTC Bus terminus at Zirakpur, Mohali.

PEPSU Road Transport Corporation (PRTC) is a bus operator in Punjab state of India. It is a state-run corporation, with headquarters in Patiala. The company was originally formed as the Road Transport Corporation of the state of PEPSU, but when that state was merged into Punjab, it became the Road Transport Corporation for the whole of Punjab. In 1966, when Haryana and Himachal were carved out of Punjab, they formed their own Road Transport Companies named as HRTC and Haryana Roadways.

== History and operations ==
The PRTC in Patiala was established on 16 October 1956 under the provision of the Road Transport Corporations Act 1950, in order to provide efficient, adequate, economic and properly co-ordinated road transport services in the state. It commenced passenger transport operations with a small investment of ₹25.00 lacs and a fleet of 60 buses covering 11,107 daily scheduled kilometers on 15 routes with 345 employees. Currently the PRTC owns 1,142 ordinary buses on 600 routes (including inter-state routes), covering a daily mileage of 349,928 kilometers. It has 3,993 employees, of which 1,022 are regular. PRTC has 9 depots and 15 bus stands across the Punjab, located at Patiala, Bathinda, Kapurthala, Barnala, Sangrur, Budhlada, Faridkot, Ludhiana, Chandigarh and Special Cell of KM Scheme at Patiala.

== Fleet Addition ==
Punjab Transport Minister Laljit Singh Bhullar today directed officials of Punjab Roadways and PRTC to expedite the induction of new buses into their fleets. Notably, the state is set to add 606 buses to the Punbus fleet and 656 to the PRTC fleet, including 100 mini buses, bringing the total to 1,262 new vehicles.

Chairing a review meeting on the ongoing bus procurement process, the Minister stated that under the leadership of Chief Minister S. Bhagwant Singh Mann, the Punjab government has significantly strengthened public transport services. He added that improved service quality has helped restore public trust in government-run buses, resulting in increased revenue per kilometer.

Bhullar further instructed Punjab Roadways and PRTC officials to ensure that the procurement of new buses is completed before the existing fleet is phased out, so that the public does not face any inconvenience.

Those present at the meeting included PRTC Managing Director Bikramjit Singh Shergill, Punjab Roadways Director Rajiv Gupta, along with other senior officials.
