= FASTag =

Electronic toll collection system in India

- Easy to Cruise
- Type: Electronic toll collection Fuel purchase payment Parking fees National Park Entry Fees
- Founded: 4 November 2014; 11 years ago
- Headquarters: Dwarka, Delhi, India
- Area served: Pan-India
- Products: RFID Tags
- Owner: Indian Highways Management Company Limited
- Parent: Ministry of Road Transport and Highways
- Website: nhai.gov.in#/national-electronic-toll-collection

FASTag is an electronic toll collection system in India, operated by the National Highways Authority of India (NHAI). It employs Radio Frequency Identification (RFID) technology for making toll payments directly from the prepaid or savings account linked to it or directly toll owner. It is affixed on the windscreen of the vehicle and enables one to drive through toll plazas without stopping for transactions. The tag can be purchased from official Tag issuers or participating Banks which are Made in India and if it is linked to a prepaid account, then recharging or top-up can be as per requirement. The minimum recharge amount is ₹100 and can be done online. As per NHAI, FASTag has unlimited validity. 7.5% cashback offers were also provided to promote the use of FASTag. Dedicated Lanes at some Toll plazas have been built for FASTag.

In January 2019, state-run oil marketing companies IOC, BPCL and HPCL have signed MoUs enabling the use of FASTag to make purchases at petrol pumps.

As of September 2019, FASTag lanes are available on over 500 national and state highways and over 54.6 lakh (5.46 million) cars are enabled with FASTag. Starting 1 January 2021, FASTag was to be mandatory for all vehicles but later the date was postponed to 15 February 2021. FASTag transactions were valued at ₹5,559.91 crore in January 2024 with 33.138 crore in volume terms.

== FASTag Annual Pass ==
The Indian government has launched 15 August 2025 a new toll policy that introduced a FASTag Annual Pass, allowing private vehicle owners to travel unlimited distances on national highways and expressways for one year or 200 trips (toll crossings) whichever is earlier by one-time payment of ₹3,000. This initiative aims to simplify toll payments and reduce congestion at toll plazas by eliminating the need for frequent recharges and individual toll deductions.

Under the dual-payment system, vehicle owners would have the option to choose between:

- Annual Pass: A flat fee of ₹3,000 per year for up to 200 toll crossin on national highways and expressways.

The new system would utilize the existing FASTag infrastructure, requiring no additional documents or installations. Notably, the government has shelved an earlier proposal that suggested a lifetime FASTag costing ₹30,000 for 15 years.

To further enhance the toll collection process, the policy also aims to eliminate physical toll booths, replacing them with sensor-based digital toll collection systems that rely on GPS and automated vehicle tracking for toll deductions. This move is expected to ensure barrier-free travel and reduce travel time for commuters.

To address concerns from contractors and toll operators, the Ministry of Road Transport and Highways plans to compensate them based on digital toll data and a government-approved formula. Additionally, banks may be granted more authority to prevent toll evasion, including enforcing minimum balance requirements on FASTag-linked accounts.

If implemented, this policy could significantly ease congestion, reduce travel time, and lower the cost of long-distance road travel for regular commuters.

== Timeline ==
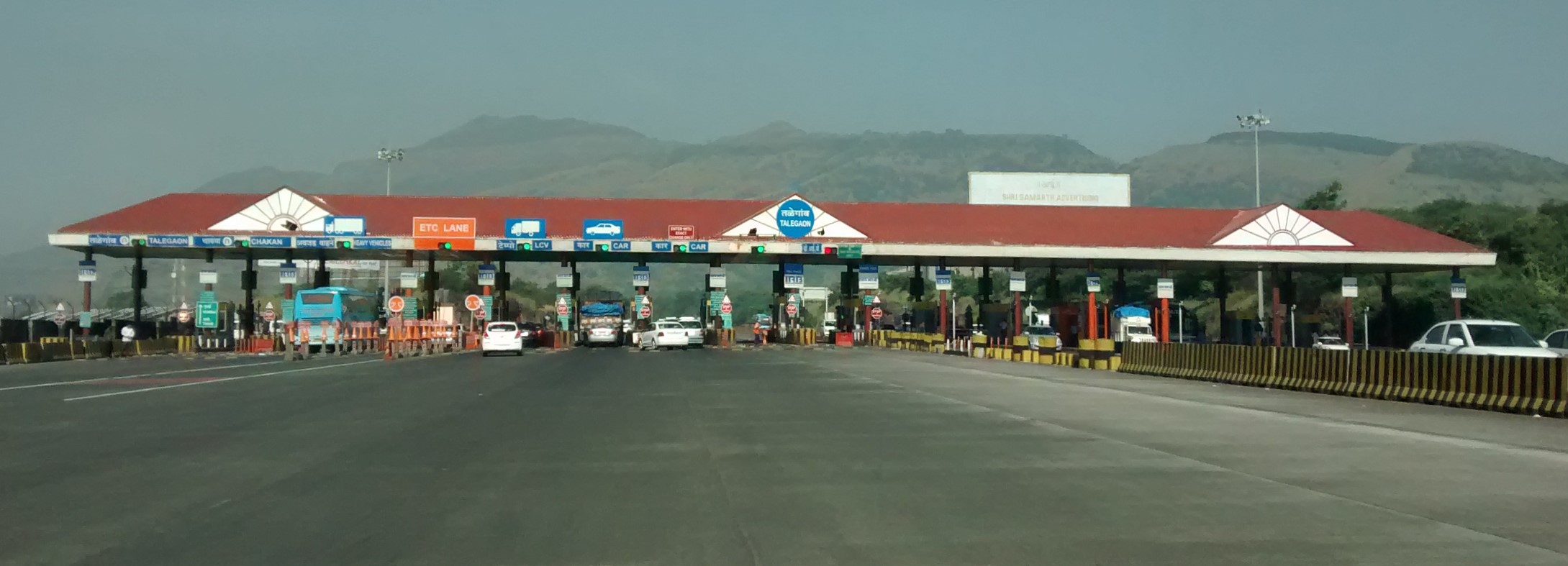
Electronic Toll Lanes on the Mumbai–Pune Expressway.

- The system was initially set up as a pilot project in 2014 on the stretch of the Golden Quadrilateral between Ahmedabad and Mumbai.
- The system was implemented on the Delhi - Mumbai arm of the Quadrilateral on 4 November 2014.
- In July 2015, toll plazas on the Chennai - Bangalore stretch of the Golden Quadrilateral started accepting FASTag payments.
- By April 2016, FASTag was rolled out to 247 toll plazas on national highways across India, representing 70% of all toll plazas in the country at the time.
- By 23 November 2016, 347 fee plazas out of 366 on national highways across the country accept FASTag payments.
- On 1 October 2017, the NHAI launched a FASTag lane in all 370 toll plazas under its ambit.
- On 8 November 2017, it was followed up by making FASTag mandatory on all new vehicles sold in India after December 2017.
- On 19 October 2019, it was announced that FASTag will be mandatory on all National Highways from 1 December 2019 and non-FASTag users will be charged double the toll.
- During November, GMR Hyderabad International Airport launches FASTag Car Park facility.
- On 15 December 2019, FASTag became mandatory throughout India.
- 600+ Toll Plazas are now connected with FASTag. Many more are in queue to connect very soon.
- South India (Tamil Nadu, Andhra Pradesh, Karnataka, Telangana, Kerala) contributed 28.75% of the total collection from 2017-18 to 2020-21.
- On 1 January 2021, FASTag was made mandatory at every toll plaza in the country. but later the date was postponed to 15 February 2021.
- Starting 1 February 2024, NHAI stated that only the most recent FASTag account will remain operational, while earlier tags will be deactivated or blacklisted.
- The monthly pass fee for local personal use vehicles residing within 20 km from the toll plaza in 2022 is Rs. 315.00/. For the financial year 2025-26, the monthly pass fee for non-commercial vehicles residing within 20 km from the toll plaza will be Rs. 350.00/-
- On 15 August 2025, the Central Government introduced Rs.3,000 annual pass for personal use vehicles. This pass allows personal use vehicle to travel any 200 toll booths and the annual pass having an expiry date for one year, whichever comes first. This annual pass is expected to save individuals more than 70% from their toll expenses.
- As per the National Highway Toll Rules, 2008, in the absence of alternate routes or service roads, No toll will be charged for the use of two-wheelers, three-wheelers, tractors and animal-drawn vehicles on the National Highway, permanent bridge, bypass or Tunnel. On 26 June 2025, the Minister of Highways clarified that no toll will be levied on two-wheelers.

== Statistics ==
Toll Gate Payment collection status [2017-2022]
Period	Toll Gate Payment collection status Total(Cr.)	Fastag Method collection (Cr.)
2016-17	17942.14	871
2017-18	21948.13	3532
2018-19	24396.20	5956
2019-20	26850.71	10957
2020-21	27744.15	25291
2021-22	34535	33274
