= Contactless smart card =

Allowing for contactless payments in credit and debit cards

A contactless smart card is a contactless credential whose dimensions are credit card size. Its embedded integrated circuits can store (and sometimes process) data and communicate with a terminal via NFC. Commonplace uses include transit tickets, bank cards and passports.

There are two broad categories of contactless smart cards. Memory cards contain non-volatile memory storage components, and perhaps some specific security logic. Contactless smart cards contain read-only RFID called CSN (Card Serial Number) or UID, and a re-writeable smart card microchip that can be transcribed via radio waves.

== Overview ==
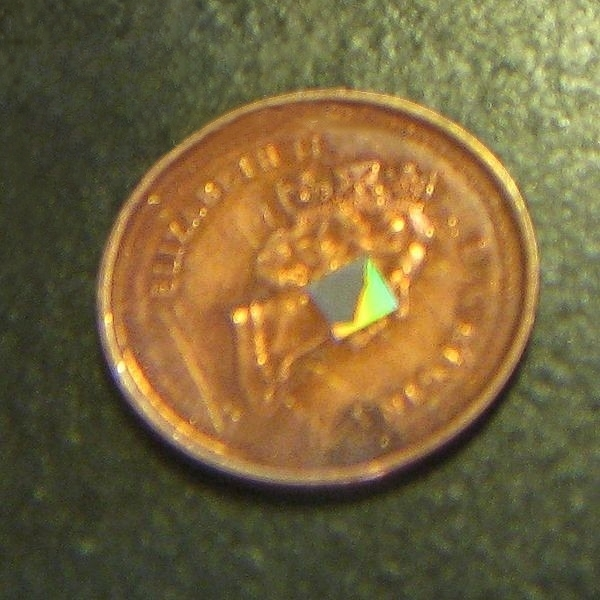
Size comparison of chip compared to a Canadian penny

A contactless smart card is characterized as follows:

- Dimensions are normally credit card size. The ID-1 of ISO/IEC 7810 standard defines them as 85.60 × 53.98 × 0.76 mm (3.370 × 2.125 × 0.030 in).
- Contains a security system with tamper-resistant properties (e.g. a secure cryptoprocessor, secure file system, human-readable features) and is capable of providing security services (e.g. confidentiality of information in the memory).
- Assets managed by way of a central administration systems, or applications, which receive or exchange information with the card, such as card hotlisting and updates for application data.
- Card data is transferred via radio waves to the central administration system through card read-write devices, such as point of sale devices, doorway access control readers, ticket readers, ATMs, USB-connected desktop readers, etc.

=== Benefits ===
Contactless smart cards can be used for identification, authentication, and data storage. They also provide a means of effecting business transactions in a flexible, secure, standard way with minimal human intervention.

== History ==
Contactless smart cards were first used for electronic ticketing in 1995 in Seoul, South Korea.

Since then, smart cards with contactless interfaces have been increasingly popular for payment and ticketing applications such as mass transit. Globally, contactless fare collection is being employed for efficiencies in public transit. The various standards emerging are local in focus and are not compatible, though the MIFARE Classic card from Philips has a large market share in the United States and Europe.

In more recent times, Visa and MasterCard have agreed to standards for general "open loop" payments on their networks, with millions of cards deployed in the U.S., in Europe and around the world.

Smart cards are being introduced in personal identification and entitlement schemes at regional, national, and international levels. Citizen cards, drivers’ licenses, and patient card schemes are becoming more prevalent. In Malaysia, the compulsory national ID scheme MyKad includes 8 different applications and is rolled out for 18 million users. Contactless smart cards are being integrated into ICAO biometric passports to enhance security for international travel.

During the COVID-19 pandemic, demand for and usage of contactless credit and debit cards increased, although research suggests that coins and banknotes generally carry a low risk of carrying the virus.

=== Readers ===
Contactless smart card readers use radio waves to communicate with, and both read and write data on a smart card. When used for electronic payment, they are commonly located near PIN pads, cash registers and other places of payment. When the readers are used for public transit they are commonly located on fare boxes, ticket machines, turnstiles, and station platforms as a standalone unit. When used for security, readers are usually located to the side of an entry door.

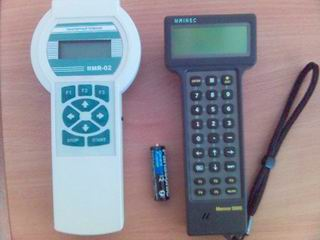
Novosibirsk (Russia). Transport fare collection terminal CFT

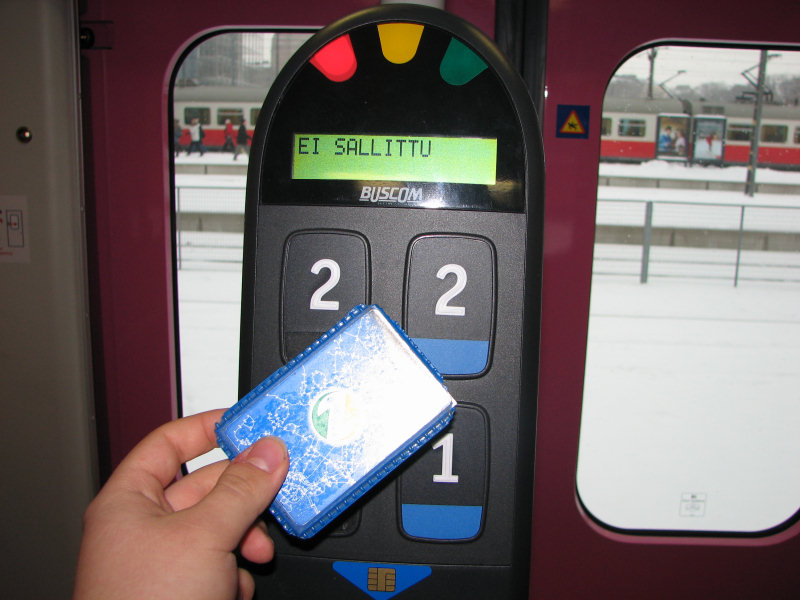
Smart card being used to pay for public transportation in the Helsinki area

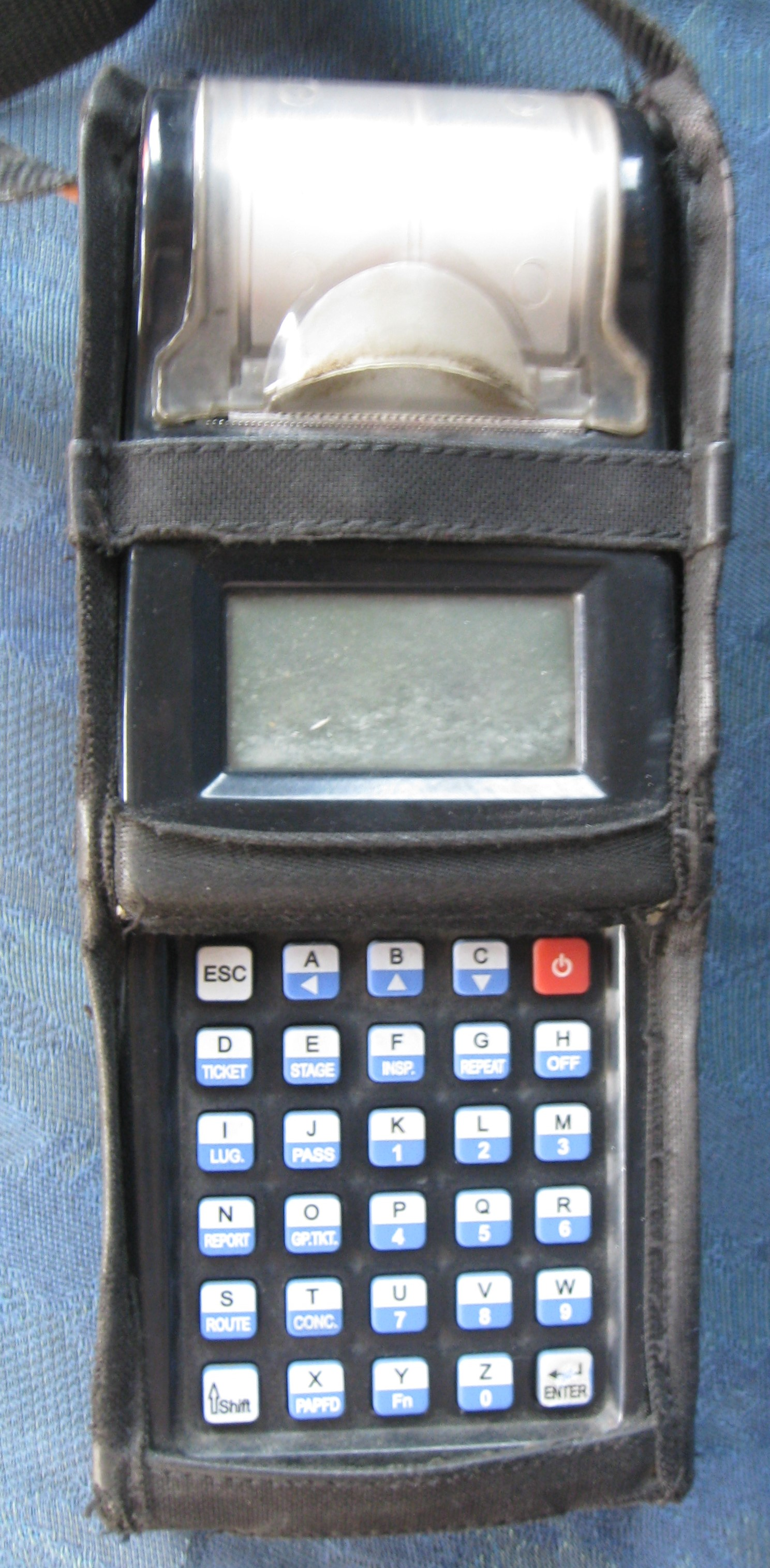
An electronic ticket machine used to read prepaid cards and issue tickets in Mumbai

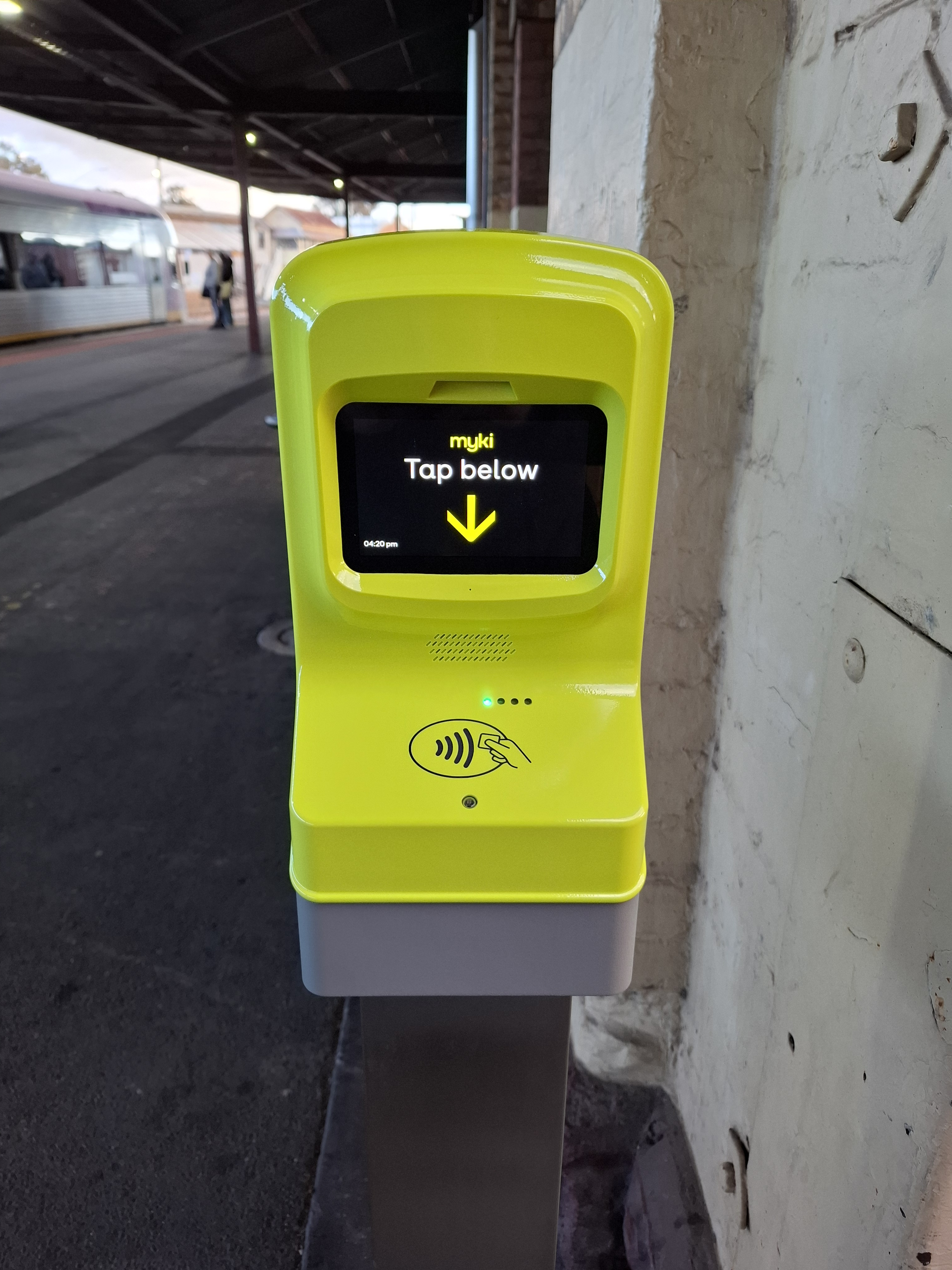
Myki reader installed at Bendigo railway station

== Technology ==
RF smart card schematic

A contactless smart card is a card in which the chip communicates with the card reader through an induction technology similar to that of an RFID (at data rates of 106 to 848 kbit/s). These cards require only close proximity to an antenna to complete a transaction. They are often used when transactions must be processed quickly or hands-free, such as on mass transit systems, where a smart card can be used without even removing it from a wallet.

The standard for contactless smart card communications is ISO/IEC 14443. It defines two types of contactless cards ("A" and "B") and allows for communications at distances up to 10 cm (3.9 in). There had been proposals for ISO/IEC 14443 types C, D, E, F and G that have been rejected by the International Organization for Standardization. An alternative standard for contactless smart cards is ISO/IEC 15693, which allows communications at distances up to 50 cm (1.6 ft).

Examples of widely used contactless smart cards are Seoul's Upass (1996), Malaysia Touch 'n Go card (1997), Hong Kong's Octopus card, Shanghai's Public Transportation Card (1999), Paris's Navigo card, Japan's Suica (2001), Singapore's EZ-Link, Taiwan's EasyCard, San Francisco Bay Area's Clipper Card (2002), London's Oyster card, Beijing's Municipal Administration and Communications Card (2003), South Korea's T-money, Southern Ontario's Presto card, India's More Card, Israel's Rav-Kav Card (2008), Melbourne's Myki card and Sydney's Opal card which predate the ISO/IEC 14443 standard. The following tables list smart cards used for public transportation and other electronic purse applications.

A related contactless technology is RFID (radio frequency identification). In certain cases, it can be used for applications similar to those of contactless smart cards, such as for electronic toll collection. RFID devices usually do not include writeable memory or microcontroller processing capability as contactless smart cards often do.

There are dual-interface cards that implement contactless and contact interfaces on a single card with some shared storage and processing. An example is Porto's multi-application transport card, called Andante, that uses a chip in contact and contactless (ISO/IEC 14443 type B) mode.

Like smart cards with contacts, contactless cards do not have a battery. Instead, they use a built-in inductor, using the principle of resonant inductive coupling, to capture some of the incident electromagnetic signal, rectify it, and use it to power the card's electronics.

== Communication protocols ==
Communication protocols
Name	Description
ISO/IEC 14443	APDU transmission via the protocol defined in ISO/IEC 14443-4

== Applications ==
=== Transportation ===
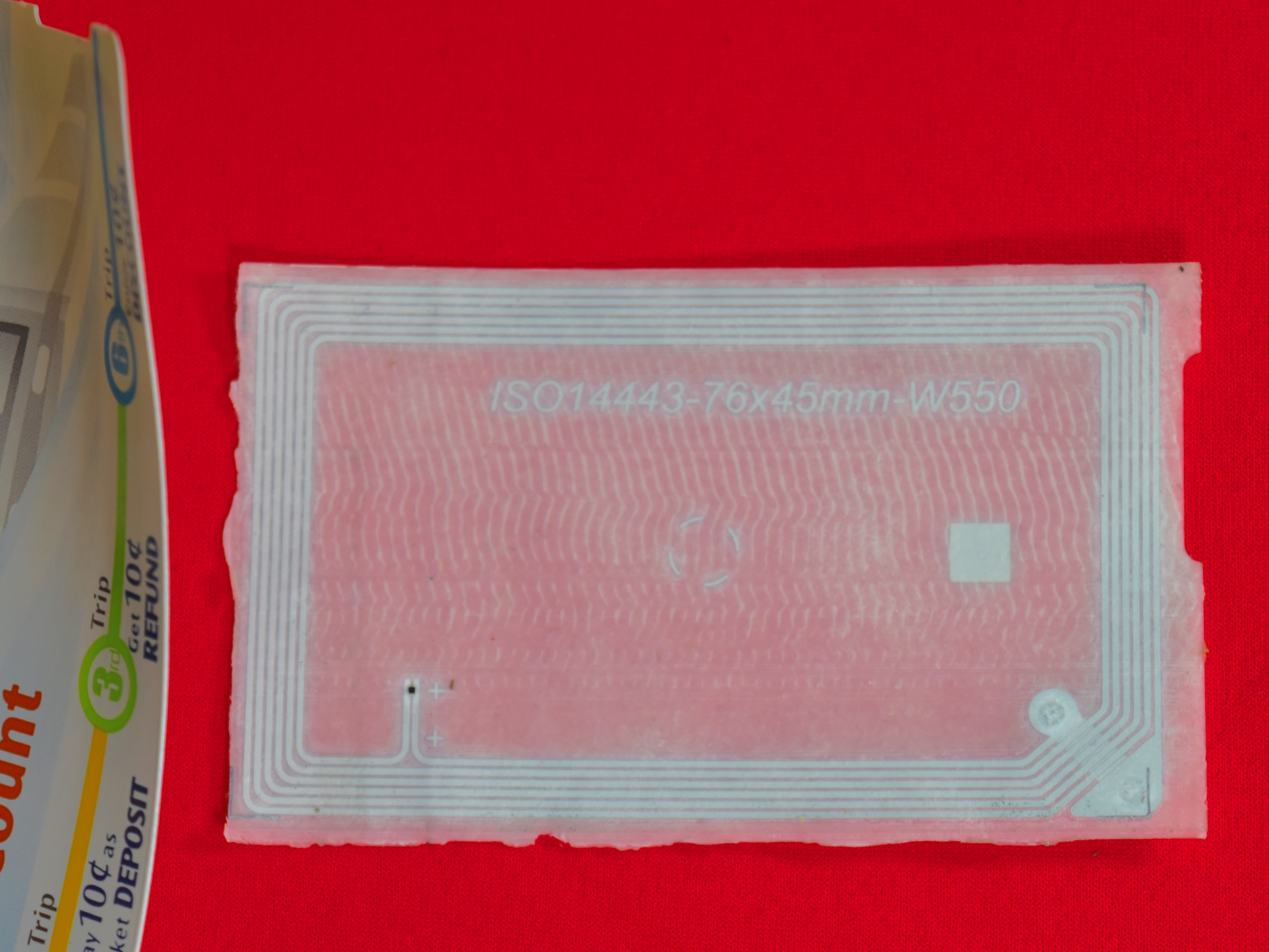
The plastic inlay (right) that contains IC and antenna inside paper contactless smart card used in public transportation in Singapore (left)

Since the start of using the Seoul Transportation Card, numerous cities have moved to the introduction of contactless smart cards as the fare media in an automated fare collection system.

In a number of cases these cards carry an electronic wallet as well as fare products, and can be used for low-value payments.

=== Contactless bank cards ===
Starting around 2005, a major application of the technology has been contactless payment credit and debit cards. Some major examples include:

- ExpressPay – American Express
- MasterCard Contactless (formerly PayPass) – MasterCard
- Visa Contactless (formerly payWave) – Visa
- QuickPass – UnionPay
- JCB Contactless (formerly J/Speedy), QUICPay (not compatible with EMV Contactless/ISO/IEC 14443) – JCB
- RuPay Contactless - RuPay
- Zip – Discover

Roll-outs started in 2005 in the United States, and in 2006 in some parts of Europe and Asia (Singapore). In the U.S., contactless (non PIN) transactions cover a payment range of ~$5–$100.

In general there are two classes of contactless bank cards: magnetic stripe data (MSD) and contactless EMV.

Contactless MSD cards are similar to magnetic stripe cards in terms of the data they share across the contactless interface. They are only distributed in the U.S. Payment occurs in a similar fashion to mag-stripe, without a PIN and often in off-line mode (depending on parameters of the terminal). The security level of such a transaction is better than a mag-stripe card, as the chip cryptographically generates a code which can be verified by the card issuer's systems.

Contactless EMV cards have two interfaces (contact and contactless) and work as a normal EMV card via their contact interface. The contactless interface provides similar data to a contact EMV transaction, but usually a subset of the capabilities (e.g. usually issuers will not allow balances to be increased via the contactless interface, instead requiring the card to be inserted into a device which uses the contact interface). EMV cards may carry an "offline balance" stored in their chip, similar to the electronic wallet or "purse" that users of transit smart cards are used to.

=== Identification ===
A quickly growing application is in digital identification cards. In this application, the cards are used for authentication of identity. The most common example is in conjunction with a PKI. The smart card will store an encrypted digital certificate issued from the PKI along with any other relevant or needed information about the card holder. Examples include the U.S. Department of Defense (DoD) Common Access Card (CAC), and the use of various smart cards by many governments as identification cards for their citizens. When combined with biometrics, smart cards can provide two- or three-factor authentication. Smart cards are not always a privacy-enhancing technology, for the subject carries possibly incriminating information about him all the time. By employing contactless smart cards, that can be read without having to remove the card from the wallet or even the garment it is in, one can add even more authentication value to the human carrier of the cards.

=== Other ===
The Malaysian government uses smart card technology in the identity cards carried by all Malaysian citizens and resident non-citizens. The personal information inside the smart card (called MyKad) can be read using special APDU commands.

== Security ==
Smart cards have been advertised as suitable for personal identification tasks, because they are engineered to be tamper resistant. The embedded chip of a smart card usually implements some cryptographic algorithm. However, there are several methods of recovering some of the algorithm's internal state.

=== Differential power analysis ===
Differential power analysis involves measuring the precise time and electric current required for certain encryption or decryption operations. This is most often used against public key algorithms such as RSA in order to deduce the on-chip private key, although some implementations of symmetric ciphers can be vulnerable to timing or power attacks as well.

=== Physical disassembly ===
Smart cards can be physically disassembled by using acid, abrasives, or some other technique to obtain direct, unrestricted access to the on-board microprocessor. Although such techniques obviously involve a fairly high risk of permanent damage to the chip, they permit much more detailed information (e.g. photomicrographs of encryption hardware) to be extracted.

=== Eavesdrop on NFC communication ===
Short distance (≈10 cm. or 4″) is required for supplying power. The radio frequency, however, can be eavesdropped within several meters once powered-up.

== Concerns ==
Failure rate
The plastic card in which the chip is embedded is fairly flexible, and the larger the chip, the higher the probability of breaking. Smart cards are often carried in wallets or pockets — a fairly harsh environment for a chip. However, for large banking systems, the failure-management cost can be more than offset by the fraud reduction. A card enclosure may be used as an alternative to help prevent the smart card from failing.
Privacy
Using a smart card for mass transit presents a risk for privacy, because such a system enables the mass transit operator, the banks, and the authorities, to track the movement of individuals. The same argument can be made for banks tracking retail payments. Such information was used in the investigation of the Myyrmanni bombing.
Theft and fraud
Contactless technology does not necessarily prevent use of a PIN for authentication of the user, but it is common for low value transactions (bank credit or debit card purchase, or public transport fare payment) not to require a PIN. This may make such cards more likely to be stolen, or used fraudulently by the finder of someone else's lost card.
Use abroad
Inland data networks quickly convey information between terminals and central banking systems, such that contactless payment limits may be monitored and managed. This may not be possible with use of such cards when abroad.
Multiple cards detection
When two or more contactless cards are in close proximity the system may have difficulty determining which card is intended to be used. The card-reader may charge the incorrect card or reject both. This is generally only an issue where a service provider uses a payment card to facilitate access - eg a wallet containing a parking lot access card, an apartment building entry card and various contactless payment cards can usually be used on entry to a car park or whatever - the car park entry system can detect its own card in the wallet and open the barrier. In a retail shop, however, it is advisable to remove the individual contactless card from the wallet when making a payment. At the very least this gives the cardholder the opportunity to communicate which card they intend to be used to make payment. It is an issue of the card identifying a subscription -v- payment by transaction.

== See also ==
- Access badge
- Access control
  - Disk encryption
  - Keycard lock
  - Physical security
- Android Pay
- Apple Pay
- Samsung Pay
- Biometric passport
- Common Access Card
- Contactless payment
- Credential
- Electronic money
- EMV
- Identity document
- Java Card
- List of smart cards
- Magnetic stripe card
- Microchip implant (human)
- MULTOS
- Near-field communication
- Octopus Card
- Payment Card Industry Data Security Standard
- Proximity card
- Radio-frequency identification
- Security engineering
- Single sign-on
- Smart card
- SNAPI
- Subscriber identity module
- Telephone card
