= Cardkey =

American access control company

Cardkey was a producer of electronic access control products and was based in Simi Valley, California. They were the first company to develop and widely distribute "Electronic Access Control Systems".

The company's original readers used cards which were made from barium ferrite and worked by magnetically attracting and repelling locking/unlocking cores within the reader module mechanism. These cards were primarily used by fraternal organizations and clubs, such as BPOE (Elks) and others. From there they were the first to develop Wiegand cards and readers which were again magnetically based but were more reliable and did not require calibration as used in the barium ferrite readers. These cards and readers were highly programmable, and used in applications ranging from ADT (American District Telegraph) to government installations worldwide.

In the UK they had offices in Manchester and Reading and sold their systems to companies such as British Telecom, Shell and BP. The main facility for Cardkey was located on Nordhoff and Mason in Chatsworth with an additional location on Cozycroft in Chatsworth which housed Customer Engineering and a singular Engineering project (PASS system) in approximately 1978.

They were once a division of Greer Hydraulics, Inc., and in January 1999 they were bought out by Johnson Controls, a company whose founder invented the electric room thermostat in the late 1800s.

== See also ==
- card reader
- key card
