= Barkhausen effect =

Phenomenon in ferromagnetism

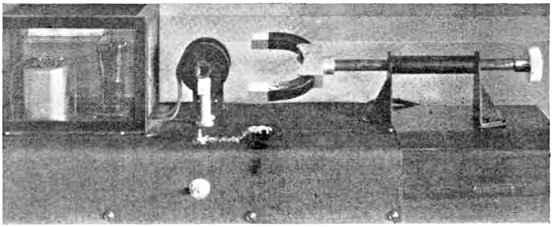
Replica of Barkhausen's original apparatus, consisting of an iron bar with a coil of wire around it (center) with the coil connected through a vacuum tube amplifier (left) to an earphone (not shown). When the horseshoe magnet (right) is rotated, the magnetic field through the iron changes from one direction to the other, and the crackling Barkhausen noise is heard in the earphone.

Magnetization (J) or flux density (B) curve as a function of magnetic field intensity (H) in ferromagnetic material. The inset shows Barkhausen jumps.

Origin of the Barkhausen noise: as a domain wall moves it gets caught on a defect in the crystal lattice, then "snaps" past it, creating a sudden change in the magnetic field.

The Barkhausen effect is a name given to the noise in the magnetic output of a ferromagnet when the magnetizing force applied to it is changed. Discovered by German physicist Heinrich Barkhausen in 1919, it is caused by rapid changes in the size of magnetic domains (similarly magnetically oriented atoms in ferromagnetic materials).

Barkhausen's work in acoustics and magnetism led to the discovery, which became the main piece of experimental evidence supporting the domain theory of ferromagnetism proposed in 1906 by Pierre-Ernest Weiss. The Barkhausen effect is a series of sudden changes in the size and orientation of ferromagnetic domains, or microscopic clusters of aligned atomic magnets (spins), that occur during a continuous process of magnetization or demagnetization. The Barkhausen effect offered direct evidence for the existence of ferromagnetic domains, which previously had been postulated theoretically. Heinrich Barkhausen discovered that a slow, smooth increase of a magnetic field applied to a piece of ferromagnetic material, such as iron, causes it to become magnetized, not continuously but in minute steps.

== Barkhausen noise ==
When an external magnetizing field through a piece of ferromagnetic material is changed, for example by moving a magnet toward or away from an iron bar, the magnetization of the material changes in a series of discontinuous changes, causing "jumps" in the magnetic flux through the iron. These can be detected by winding a coil of wire around the bar, attached to an amplifier and loudspeaker. The sudden transitions in the magnetization of the material produce current pulses in the coil, which when amplified produce a sound in the loudspeaker. This makes a crackling sound, which has been compared to candy being unwrapped, Rice Krispies, or the sound of a log fire. This sound, first discovered by German physicist Heinrich Barkhausen, is called Barkhausen noise. Similar effects can be observed by applying only mechanical stresses (e.g. bending) to the material placed in the detecting coil.

These magnetization jumps are caused by discrete changes in the size or rotation of ferromagnetic domains. Domains change size by the domain walls moving within the crystal lattice in response to changes in the magnetic field, by the process of dipoles near the wall changing spin to align with spins in the neighboring domain. In a perfect crystal lattice this can be a continuous process, but in actual crystals local defects in the lattice, such as impurity atoms or dislocations in the structure form temporary barriers to the change of spin, causing the domain wall to be hung up on the defect. When the change in magnetic field becomes strong enough to overcome the local energy barrier at the defect, it causes a group of atoms to flip their spin at once, as the domain wall "snaps" past the defect. This sudden change in magnetization causes a transient change in magnetic flux through the bar, which is picked up by the coil as a "click" in the earphone.

The energy loss due to the domain walls moving through these defects is responsible for the hysteresis curve of ferromagnetic materials. Ferromagnetic materials with high coercivity often have more of these defects, so they produce more Barkhausen noise for a given magnetic flux change, while materials with low coercivity, such as silicon steel transformer laminations, are processed to eliminate defects, so they produce little Barkhausen noise.

== Practical use ==
A set-up for non-destructive testing of ferromagnetic materials: green – magnetising yoke, red – inductive sensor, grey – sample under test.

The amount of Barkhausen noise for a given material is linked with the amount of impurities, crystal dislocations, etc. and can be a good indication of mechanical properties of such a material. Therefore, the Barkhausen noise can be used as a method of non-destructive evaluation of the degradation of mechanical properties in magnetic materials subjected to cyclic mechanical stresses (e.g. in pipeline transport) or high-energy particles (e.g. nuclear reactor) or materials such as high-strength steels which may be subjected to damage from grinding. Schematic diagram of a simple non-destructive set-up for such a purpose is shown on the right.

Barkhausen noise can also indicate physical damage in a thin film structure due to various nanofabrication processes such as reactive ion etching or using an ion milling machine.

The Wiegand effect is a macroscopic extension of the Barkhausen effect, as the special treatment of the Wiegand wire causes the wire to act macroscopically as a single large magnetic domain. The numerous small high-coercivity domains in the Wiegand wire outer shell switch in an avalanche, generating the Wiegand effect's rapid magnetic field change.
