= Card reader =

Data input device

A card reader is a data input device that reads data from a card-shaped storage medium and provides the data to a computer. Card readers can acquire data from a card via a number of methods, including: optical scanning of printed text or barcodes or holes on punched cards, electrical signals from connections made or interrupted by a card's punched holes or embedded circuitry, or electronic devices that can read plastic cards embedded with either a magnetic strip, computer chip, RFID chip, or another storage medium.

Card readers are used for applications including identification, access control and banking, data storage, and data processing.

== Mechanisms ==
=== Magnetic card readers ===
Magnetic stripe technology, usually called mag-stripe, is so named because of the stripe of magnetic oxide tape that is laminated on a card. There are three tracks of data on the magnetic stripe. Typically the data on each of the tracks follows a specific encoding standard, but it is possible to encode any format on any track. A mag-stripe card is cheap compared to other card technologies and is easy to program. The magnetic stripe holds more data than a barcode can in the same space. While a mag-stripe is more difficult to generate than a bar code, the technology for reading and encoding data on a mag-stripe is widespread and easy to acquire. Magnetic stripe technology is also susceptible to misreads, card wear, and data corruption. These cards are also susceptible to some forms of skimming where external devices are placed over the reader to intercept the data read.

=== Smart card readers ===
Smart card readers use an electrical current to read data from embedded circuitry or magnetic features in a card. A contact smart card must physically touch contacts on a reader to connect a circuit between them. A contactless smart card uses radio waves or a magnetic field to transmit information to a reader remotely (though most readers have a range of 20 in (51 cm) or less).

==== Contact smart card readers ====
Smart card reader

A contact smart card reader is an electronic device that physically connects to an integrated circuit in a smart card, supplies the circuit in the card with electricity, and uses communications protocols to read data from the card. Smart card readers used for banking or identification may be connected to a keyboard to allow verification with a personal identification number (PIN).

Communication protocols
Name	Description
T=0	Asynchronous half-duplex byte-level transmission protocol, defined in ISO/IEC 7816-3
T=1	Asynchronous half-duplex block-level transmission protocol, defined in ISO/IEC 7816-3.
T=2	Reserved for future use.
T=3	Reserved for future use.
Contactless	APDU transmission via contactless interface ISO/IEC 14443.

If the card does not use any standard transmission protocol, but uses a custom/proprietary protocol, it has the communication protocol designation T=14.

The latest PC/SC CCID specifications define a new smart card framework. This framework works with USB devices with the specific device class 0x0B. Readers with this class do not need device drivers when used with PC/SC-compliant operating systems, because the operating system supplies the driver by default.

PKCS#11 is an API designed to be platform-independent, defining a generic interface to cryptographic tokens such as smart cards. This allows applications to work without knowledge of the reader details.

Smartcard readers have been targeted successfully by criminals in what is termed a supply chain attack, in which the readers are tampered with during manufacture or in the supply chain before delivery. The rogue devices capture customers' card details before transmitting them to criminals.

==== Contactless smart card readers ====
A contactless smart card reader uses high-frequency radio waves (13.56 MHz, as opposed to 125 kHz used in low-frequency proximity card readers), enabling faster data transfer rates (up to 848 kbit/s) and communication with multiple cards simultaneously through anti-collision protocols defined in standards like ISO/IEC 14443. This allows contactless smart cards to transmit more data efficiently compared to lower-frequency systems and supports applications such as access control and electronic payments without requiring physical contact with the reader. Contactless smart cards do not require physical contact with the reader and can function through materials like wallets or purses, typically within a range of 20 inches (51 cm) or less, depending on the reader's power and configuration. Most access control systems only read serial numbers of contactless smart cards and do not utilize the available memory. Card memory may be used for storing biometric data (i.e. fingerprint template) of a user. In such case a biometric reader first reads the template on the card and then compares it to the finger (hand, eye, etc.) presented by the user. In this way biometric data of users does not have to be distributed and stored in the memory of controllers or readers, which simplifies the system and reduces memory requirements.

===== RFID card readers =====
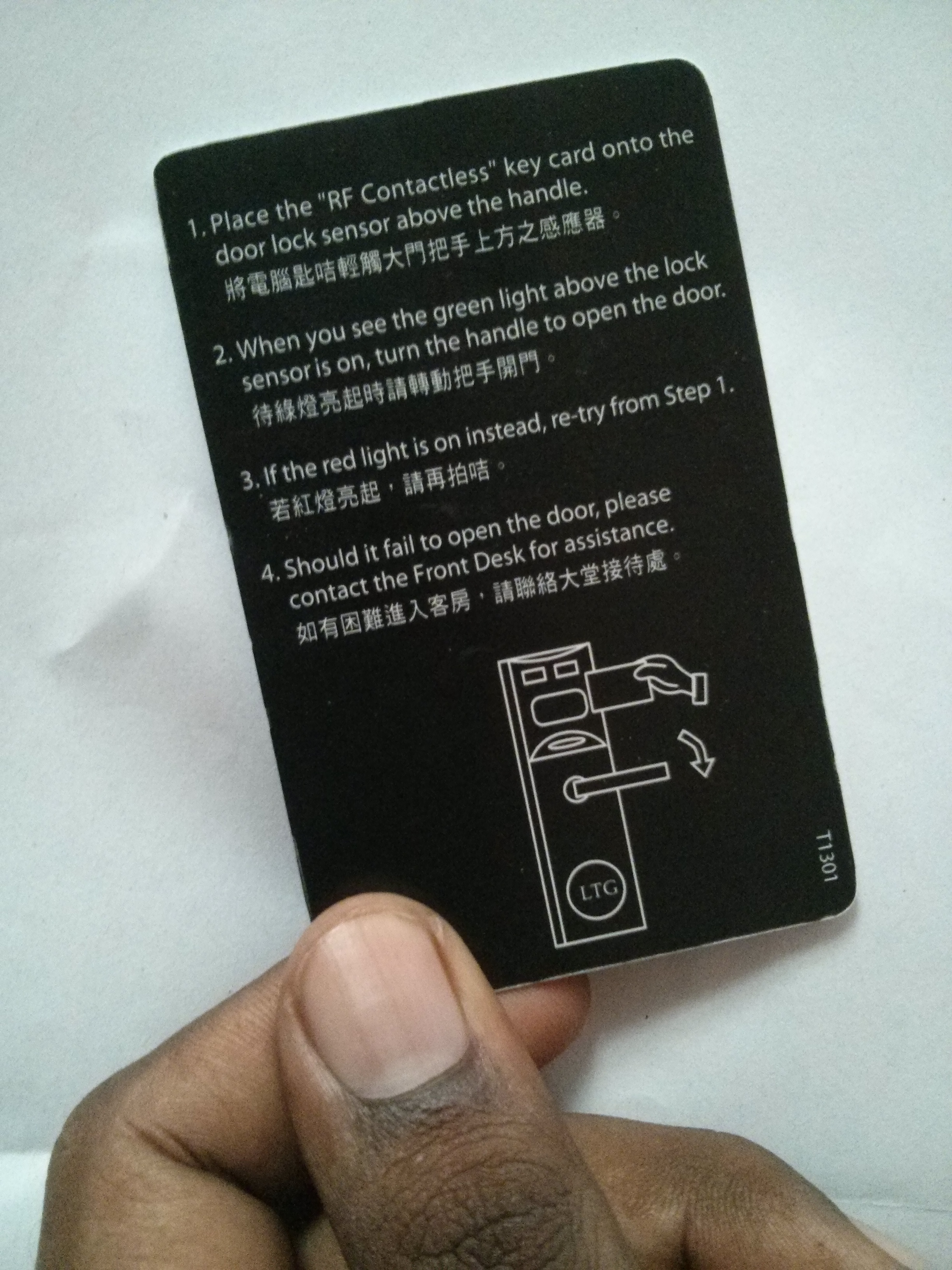
Electronic key for RFID based lock system

===== Proximity card readers =====
Access control
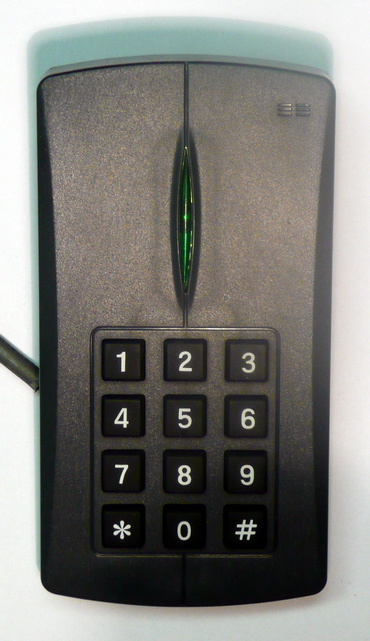
- Proximity reader with keypad
- Usage: access control

A reader radiates a 1" to 20" electrical field around itself. Cards use a simple LC circuit. When a card is presented to the reader, the reader's electrical field excites a coil in the card. The coil charges a capacitor and in turn powers an integrated circuit. The integrated circuit outputs the card number to the coil, which transmits it to the reader.

A common proximity format is 26-bit Wiegand. This format uses a facility code, sometimes also called a site code. The facility code is a unique number common to all of the cards in a particular set. The idea is that an organization will have their own facility code and a set of numbered cards incrementing from 1. Another organization has a different facility code and their card set also increments from 1. Thus different organizations can have card sets with the same card numbers but since the facility codes differ, the cards only work at one organization. This idea worked early in the technology, but as there is no governing body controlling card numbers, different manufacturers can supply cards with identical facility codes and identical card numbers to different organizations. Thus there may be duplicate cards that allow access to multiple facilities in one area. To counteract this problem some manufacturers have created formats beyond 26-bit Wiegand that they control and issue to organizations.

In the 26-bit Wiegand format, bit 1 is an even parity bit. Bits 2–9 are a facility code. Bits 10–25 are the card number. Bit 26 is an odd parity bit. 1/8/16/1. Other formats have a similar structure of a leading facility code followed by the card number and including parity bits for error checking, such as the 1/12/12/1 format used by some American access control companies.

1/8/16/1 gives as facility code limit of 255 and 65535 card number

1/12/12/1 gives a facility code limit of 4095 and 4095 card number.

Wiegand was also stretched to 34 bits, 56 bits and a number of others.

===== Wiegand card readers =====
Wiegand card technology is a patented technology using embedded ferromagnetic wires strategically positioned to create a unique pattern that generates the identification number. Like magnetic stripe or barcode technology, this card must be swiped through a reader to be read. Unlike the other technologies, the identification media is embedded in the card and not susceptible to wear. This technology once gained popularity because it is difficult to duplicate, creating a high perception of security. This technology is being replaced by proximity cards, however, because of the limited source of supply, the relatively better tamper resistance of proximity readers, and the convenience of the touch-less functionality in proximity readers.

Proximity card readers are still referred to as "Wiegand output readers", but no longer use the Wiegand effect. Proximity technology retains the Wiegand upstream data so that the new readers are compatible with old systems.

=== Memory card readers ===
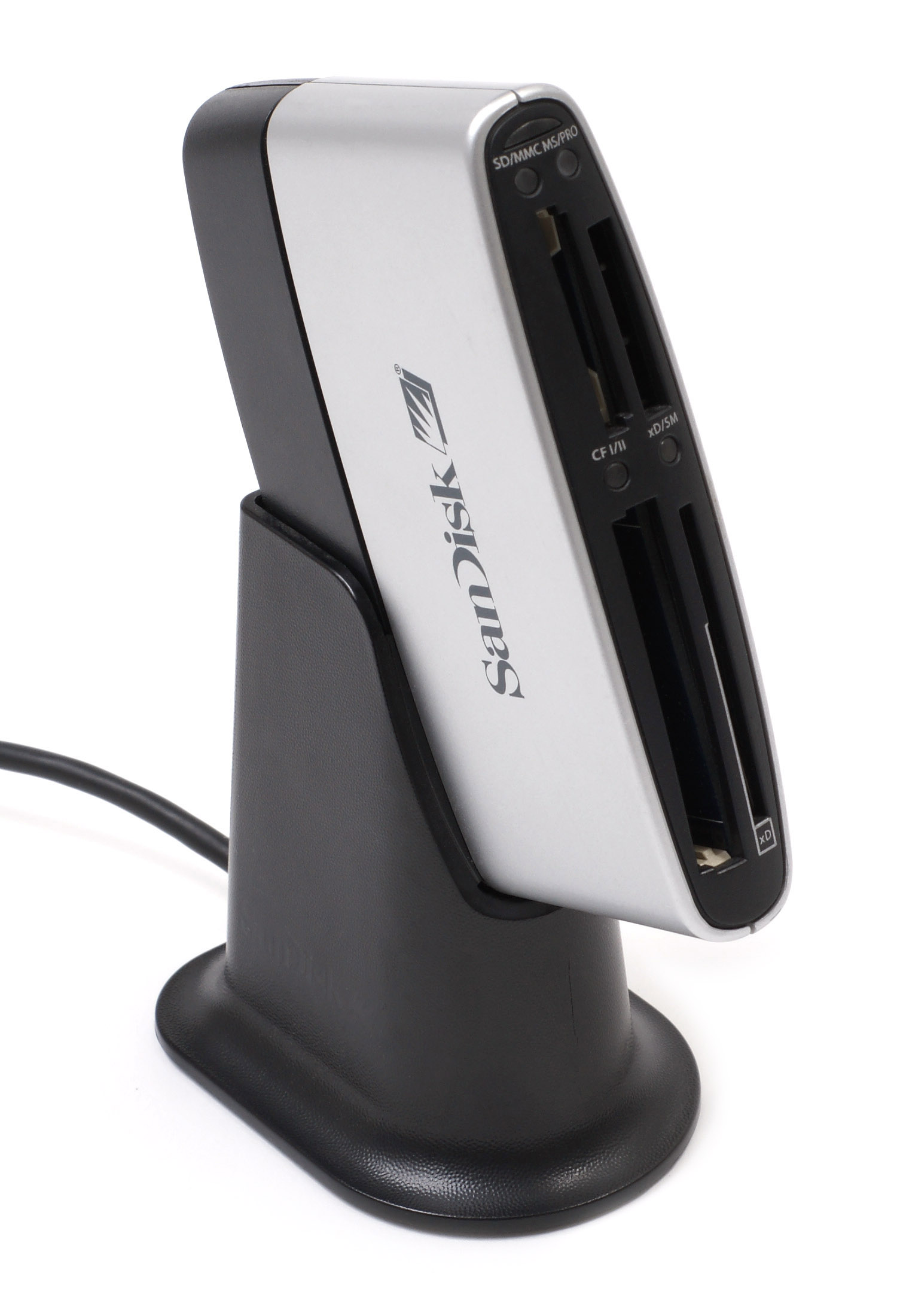
A USB card reader like this one will typically use the USB mass storage device class.

A memory card reader is a device for accessing the data on a memory card such as a CompactFlash (CF), Secure Digital (SD) or MultiMediaCard (MMC). Most card readers also offer write capability, and together with the card, this can function as a pen drive. Memory card readers can be built in to laptop computers or computer peripherals, or use a USB interface to transfer data to and from a computer.

=== Punched card readers ===
==== The Jacquard machine ====
The earliest example of a punched card reader, the Jacquard machine, physically pressed punched cards against rows of mechanical control rods to convert the data on the cards into physical positions of the loom's hooks. A hole in the card would allow the rod to pass through and remain unmoved; if there was no hole the rod would be pushed, moving its hook out of position.

==== Electrical punched card readers ====
Beginning with the Tabulating machine in 1890, data was read from punched cards by detecting whether a hole in the card allowed an electrical circuit to connect or an unpunched section of card interrupted that circuit.

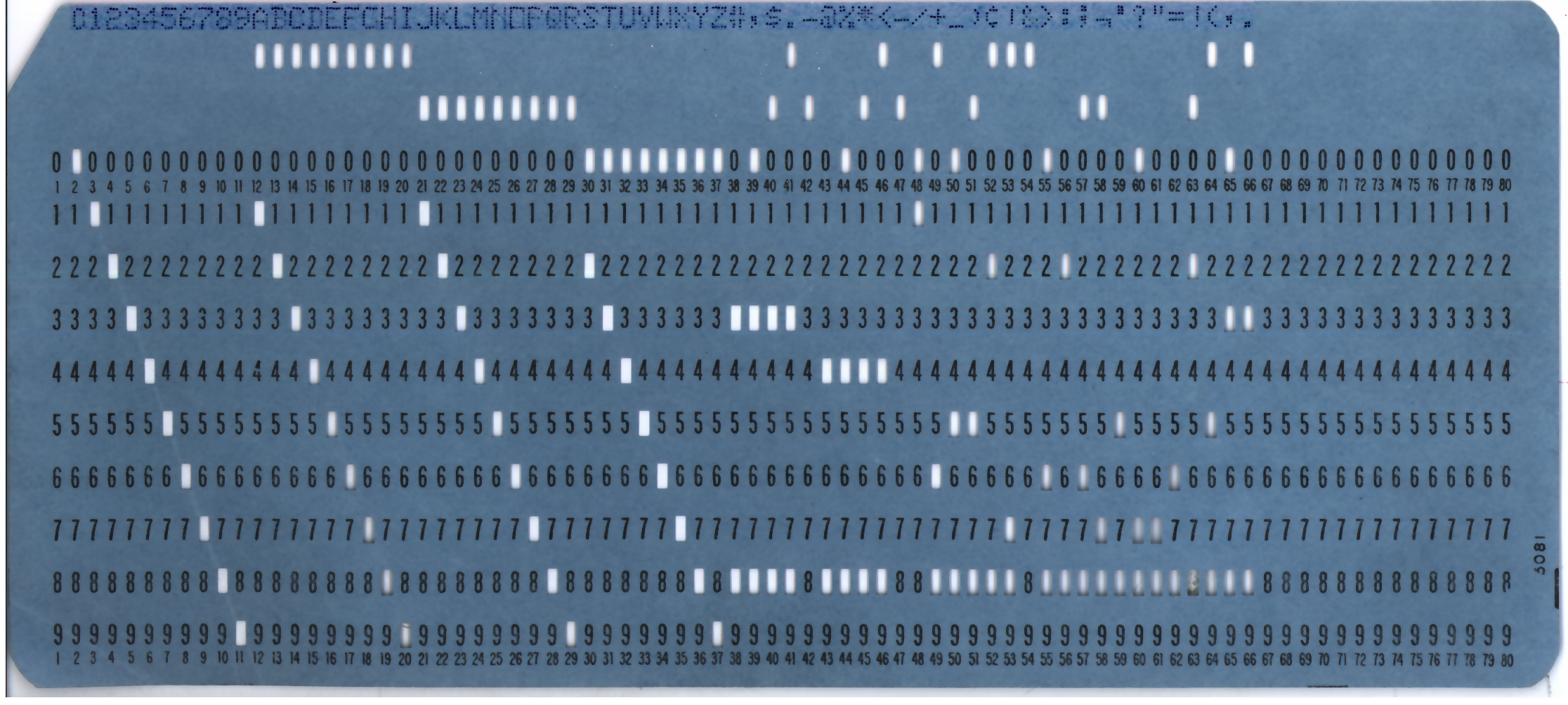
An IBM 80-column punched card of the type most widely used in the 20th century

The earliest punched card readers used pins that would dip into tiny cups of mercury when passing through a punched hole, completing an electrical circuit; in the late 1920s, IBM developed card readers that used metal brushes to make electrical contact with a roller wherever a hole passed between them.

==== Optical punched card readers ====
By 1965, punched cards were read using photoelectric sensors. The IBM 2501 is an example of an early optical punched card reader.

A photoelectric punched card reader patent was issued in 1971.

=== Other optical card readers ===
==== Business card text scanners ====
A business card reader is a portable image scanner device or mobile app that uses optical character recognition to detect specific data fields on a business card and store that data in a contact database or 'electronic rolodex'.

==== Barcode readers ====
Simple data, such as an ID number, name, or address, can be encoded onto a card with a barcode and read from the card with an optical barcode reader.

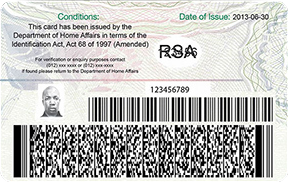
The reverse of a South African Smart ID card, which uses both 1D and 2D barcodes

== Uses ==
=== Identification and access control ===
Card readers are often used to read identification cards for the purposes of physical or electronic access control or to read data from an identity card.

Access control card readers are used in physical security systems to read a credential that allows physical access through access control points, typically a locked door. They can also be used in information security systems to control access to data. An access control reader can be a magnetic stripe reader, a bar code reader, a proximity reader, or a smart card reader.

IP access control
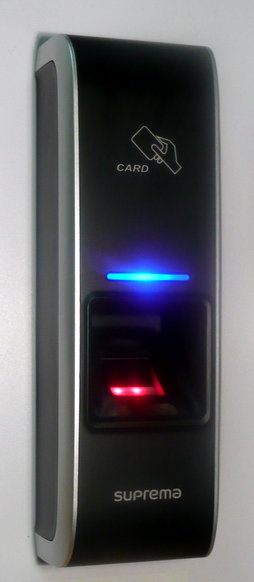
- IP fingerprint reader
- Media type: Internet Protocol
- Capacity: 10000 templates
- Usage: fingerprint identification, access control

Readers may compare the data collected from the card, or data stored in the reader, to a biometric identification: fingerprint, hand geometry, iris, Voice Recognition, and facial recognition.

A card reader with a biometric system compares the template stored in memory to the scan obtained during the process of identification. If there is a high enough degree of probability that the template in the memory is compatible with the live scan (the scan belongs to the authorized person), the ID number of that person is sent to a control panel. The control panel then checks the permission level of the user and determines whether access should be allowed. The communication between the reader and the control panel is usually transmitted using the industry standard Wiegand interface. The only exception is the intelligent biometric reader, which does not require any panels and directly controls all door hardware.

Biometric templates may be stored in the memory of readers, limiting the number of users by the reader memory size (there are reader models that have been manufactured with a storage capacity of up to 50,000 templates). User templates may also be stored in the memory of the smart card, thereby removing all limits to the number of system users (finger-only identification is not possible with this technology), or a central server PC can act as the template host. For systems where a central server is employed, known as "server-based verification", readers first read the biometric data of the user and then forward it to the main computer for processing. Server-based systems support a large number of users but are dependent on the reliability of the central server, as well as communication lines.

1-to-1 and 1-to-many are the two possible modes of operation of a biometric reader:

- In the 1-to-1 mode a user must first either present an ID card or enter a PIN. The reader then looks up the template of the corresponding user in the database and compares it with the live scan. The 1-to-1 method is considered more secure and is generally faster as the reader needs to perform only one comparison. Most 1-to-1 biometric readers are "dual-technology" readers: they either have a built-in proximity, smart card or keypad reader, or they have an input for connecting an external card reader.
- In the 1-to-many mode a user presents biometric data such as a fingerprint or retina scan and the reader then compares the live scan to all the templates stored in the memory. This method is preferred by most end-users, because it eliminates the need to carry ID cards or use PINs. On the other hand, this method is slower, because the reader may have to perform thousands of comparison operations until it finds the match. An important technical characteristic of a 1-to-many reader is the number of comparisons that can be performed in one second, which is considered the maximum time that users can wait at a door without noticing a delay. Currently most 1-to-many readers are capable of performing 2,000–3,000 matching operations per second.

=== Banking ===
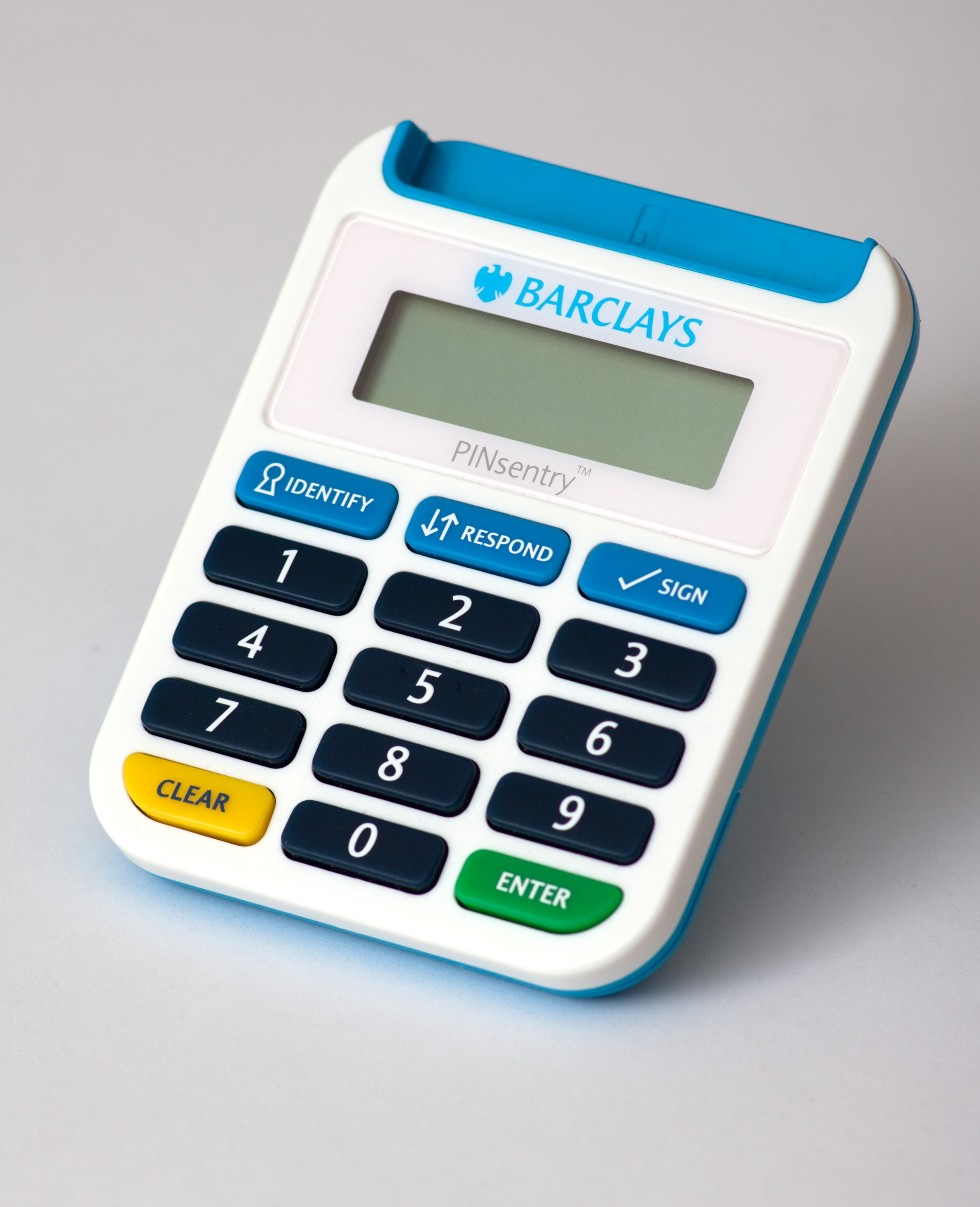
The Barclays PINsentry Chip Authentication Program device

Some banks have issued hand-held smartcard readers to their customers to support different electronic payment applications:

- Chip Authentication Program (CAP) uses EMV banking cards to authenticate online transactions as a phishing countermeasure.
- Geldkarte is a German electronic purse scheme where card readers are used to allow the card holder to verify the amount of money stored on the card and the details of the last few transactions.

=== Data tabulation ===
Throughout the 20th century, punched card readers were used to tabulate and process data including census data, financial data, and government contracts. Punched card voting was widely used in the United States from 1965 until it was effectively banned by the Help America Vote Act of 2002.

== See also ==
- Access control
- Credential
- Iris recognition
- Jacquard machine
- Glossary of computer hardware terms
- Memory card
- Physical security
- Punched card
- Punched card input/output
- Tabulating machine
- Unit record equipment
