= Proximity card =

Contactless smart card

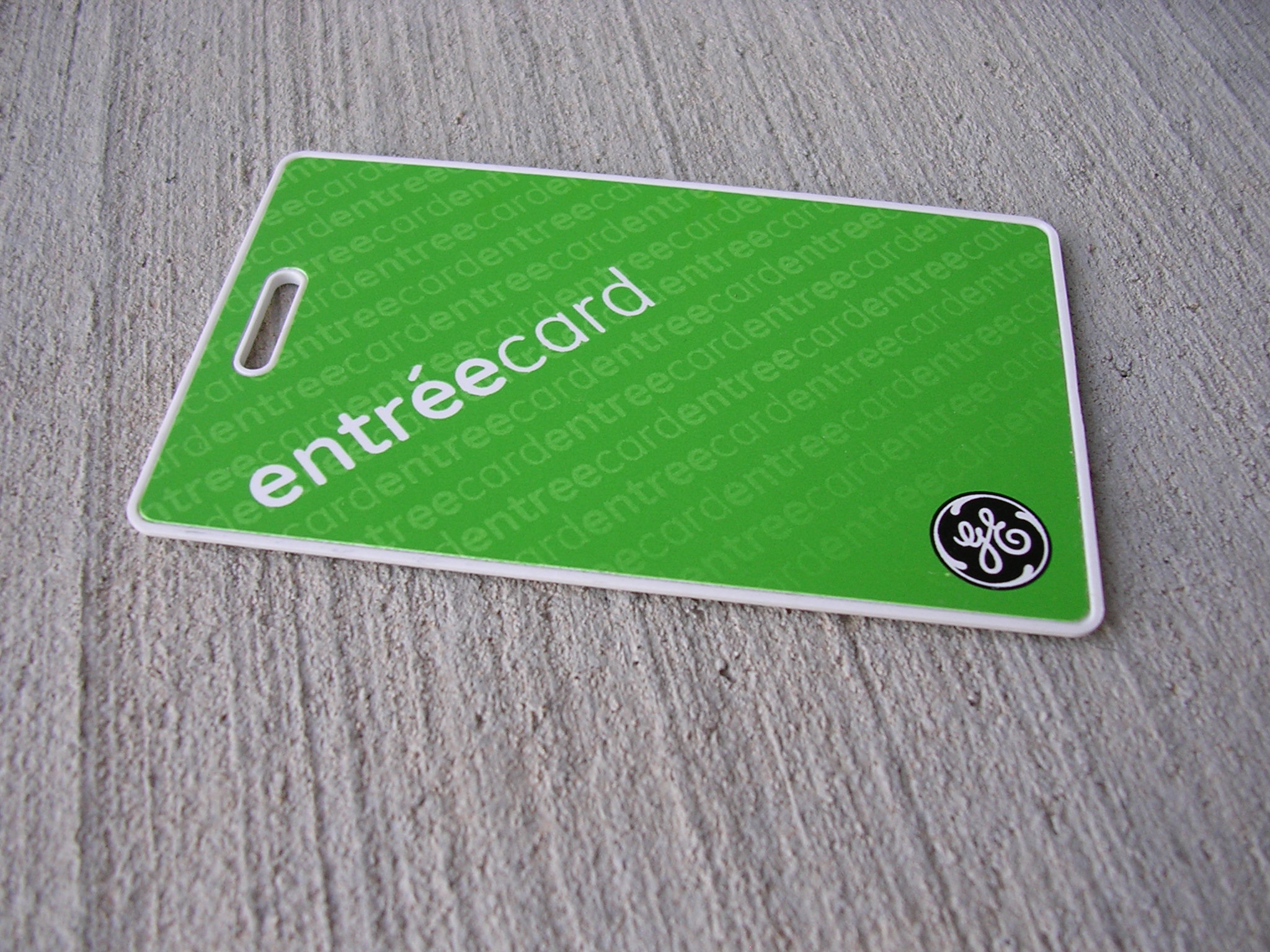
A passive proximity card for door access.

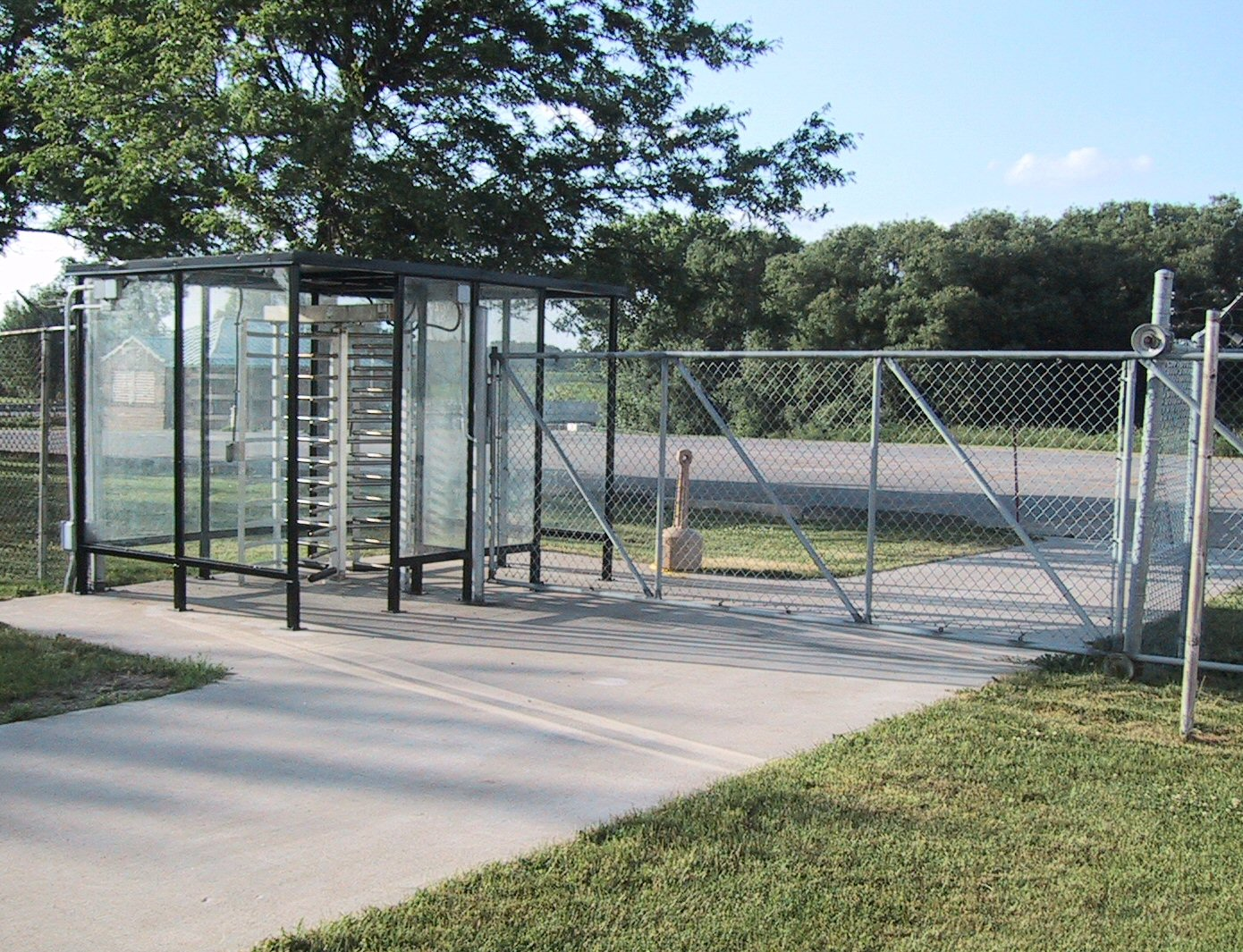
A proximity card controlled turnstile

A passive proximity card with the plastic casing opened to show components: antenna coil and smart chip integrated circuit (black object bottom center)

Anatomy of proximity card: coil and IC

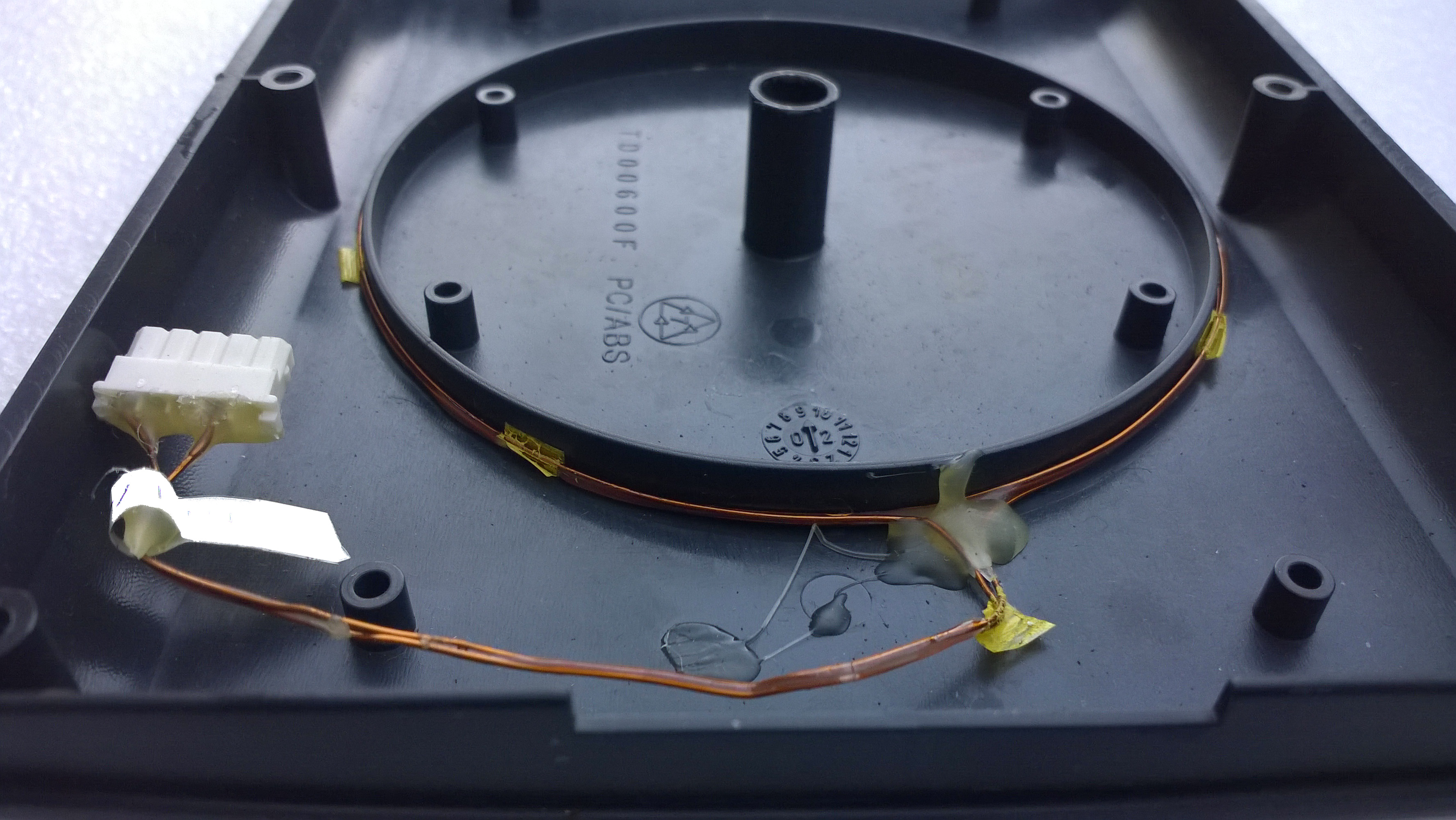
The proximity card coil of an electronic fare collection system

A proximity card or prox card, also known as a key card or keycard, is a contactless card technology that can be read without being inserting into a reader device that was required by earlier developed contact type cards: magnetic stripe cards (credit cards, etc.). They are typically used as keycards for facilities access controls (doors, gates, etc.). In its simplest form, while being held near an electronic reader, they transmit a facility code (also called a "site code") and a card serial number Readers usually produce sound and/or show a status light to indicate the card has been held close for enough time to be read.

The term "proximity card" generally refers to the original 125 kHz devices without smart chips that do not hold more data than a magnetic stripe card and are distinct from devices that hold more data such as 13.56 MHz RFID and contactless smartcards or 900 MHz devices that can also be used for facilities access control when configured with a facility code and card serial number. Prox cards can be used for rough distance estimation applications. Passive prox cards typically have a longer read range of up to 50 cm (20 in) than a passive contactless smartcard’s range of 2 to 10 cm (1 to 4 in). The card can often be left in a wallet or purse, and read by simply holding the wallet or purse near the reader. Proximity cards with smart chips can hold other types of data like history of time and attendance or biometric templates.

== Types ==
=== Passive cards ===
125 kHz passive cards are powered by radio frequency signals from the reader resulting in a limited range and typically must be held close to the reader unit. To increase the range of passive prox cards the reader can be configured with a larger antenna to create a larger magnetic field within FCC limits or operate on other frequencies that allow higher transmits power levels. Passive 900 Mhz UHF (Ultra High Frequency) smart cards can reach up to 22 meters (70 ft).

=== Active cards ===
125 kHz active prox cards, sometimes called vicinity cards are powered by an internal battery. They can have a greater range, up to 2 meters (6 ft). Active 900 Mhz UHF smart cards can reach up to 150 meters (500 ft) and are often used for applications where the card is read inside a vehicle, such as security gates which open when a vehicle with the access card inside approaches, or automated toll collection. The non-serviceable battery eventually depletes and the card must be replaced after 2 to 7 years.

== Method of operation ==
The card and reader communicate with each other through radio frequency fields by a process called resonant energy transfer. The reader antenna continuously transmits a short range RF(radio frequency) field.

Prox cards have at minimum three components which are sealed inside the plastic: an antenna consisting of an insulated coil of wire, a capacitor, and an integrated circuit (IC) which contains the data. When the card is within range of the reader, the antenna coil and capacitor, which form a tuned circuit, absorb and store energy from the reader RF field, resonating at the frequency emitted by the reader. This energy is rectified to direct current which powers the integrated circuit. The chip sends its facility code, serial ID number and other data to the antenna coil, which transmits it by radio frequency signals back to the reader unit. The reader unit itself checks, or relays the data to a remote computer to check, whether the serial ID number from the card is configured for the facility, and if part of the facility, itself performs, or the remote computer performs, whatever function it has been programmed to do for that serial ID number.

An active card can use the internal battery's power to amplify the signal from the reader unit so it is stronger, allowing the card to detect the reader's RF field at a greater distance. The battery also can power a transmitter circuit in the chip which allows the transmission of a stronger return signal to cover a greater distance.

== Standards for proximity cards ==
Proximity cards can be configured with proprietary data as is also the case of the memory-based first generation of contactless smartcards. This meant that there was no guaranteed compatibility between the readers of a specific brand and the cards of another brand.

To promote compatibility contactless smartcards can be covered by ISO/IEC 14443 and/or ISO/IEC 15693 OR ISO/IEC 18000 standards. These standards define two types of card ("A" and "B", each with different communications protocols) which typically have a range up to 10 cm (4 in). The related ISO/IEC 15693 (vicinity card) standard typically works up to a longer range of 100 centimetres (39 in). ISO/IEC 14443 as well as ISO/IEC 15693 prox cards can only be fully implemented using smart chip integrated circuits. One way to check if a technology meets ISO standard is to ask the manufacturer if it can be emulated on other devices without proprietary hardware.

== 125 kHz readers and communication protocols ==
Card readers communicate in various protocols, for example the Wiegand protocol that consists of a data 0 and a data 1 circuit (or binary or simple on/off (digital) type circuit). Other known protocols are mono directional Clock and Data or bidirectional OSDP (RS 485), RS 232 or UART. The earliest card formats were up to 64 bits long. Often, the first several serial number bits can be made identical, while the facilities code bits can be unique to allow for access control for different companies when using identical serial number bits.

For smartcards, a numbering system is internationally harmonized and allocated by Netherlands-based NEN (registration authority) according to ISO/IEC 6523 and ISO/IEC 15459 standards.

== See also ==
- Access badge
- Access control
- Campus card
- CharlieCard
- Common Access Card
- Credential
- Identity document
- Keycard
- Magnetic stripe card
- Near-field communication
- Photo identification
- Physical security
- Security
- Smart card
- Wiegand interface
