= ISO/IEC 14443 =

IEC standard

ISO/IEC 14443 Identification cards – Contactless integrated circuit cards – Proximity cards is an international standard that defines proximity cards used for identification, and the transmission protocols for communicating with it. The development of ISO/IEC 14443 began in the early 1990s, driven by the growing need for secure and efficient short-range wireless communication technologies for identification and payment systems. ISO/IEC 14443 is called contactless short-range standard with a higher RF speed compared to some other RFID standard such as ISO/IEC 15693.

== Standard ==
The standard is developed by ISO/IEC JTC 1 (Joint Technical Committee 1) / SC 17 (Subcommittee 17) / WG 8 (Working Group 8).

=== Parts ===
- ISO/IEC 14443-1:2018 Part 1: Physical characteristic
- ISO/IEC 14443-2:2020 Part 2: Radio frequency power and signal interface
- ISO/IEC 14443-3:2018 Part 3: Initialization and anticollision
- ISO/IEC 14443-4:2018 Part 4: Transmission protocol

=== Types ===
Cards may be Type A and Type B, both of which communicate via radio at 13.56 MHz (RFID HF). The main differences between these types concern modulation methods, coding schemes (Part 2) and protocol initialization procedures (Part 3). Both Type A and Type B cards use the same transmission protocol (described in Part 4). The transmission protocol specifies data block exchange and related mechanisms:

1. data block chaining
2. waiting time extension
3. multi-activation

ISO/IEC 14443 uses the following terms for components:

- PCD: proximity coupling device (the card reader)
- PICC: proximity integrated circuit card

=== Modulation methods ===
Type A cards use amplitude-shift keying (ASK) with Modified Miller coding for reader-to-tag communication. For tag-to-reader communication, they use on-off keying (OOK) with Manchester code.

Type B cards use ASK with NRZ coding for reader-to-tag communication and binary phase-shift keying (BPSK) with NRZ-L encoding for tag-to-reader communication.

Both Type A and Type B cards only allow half duplex communication with a 106 kbit per second data rate in each direction. Data transmitted by the card is load modulated with a 847.5 kHz subcarrier. (847.5 kHz is one-sixteenth of the 13.56 MHz carrier frequency provided by the reader).

Comparison of Type A & Type B Cards (Reader to Card Communication)
Feature	Type A	Type B
Frequency	13.56 MHz	13.56 MHz
Modulation	100% ASK	10% ASK
Bit Coding	Modified Miller	NRZ-L (Non-Return-to-Zero-Level)
Data Rate	106 kbps	106 kbps

Comparison of Type A & Type B Cards (Card to Reader Communication)
Feature	Type A	Type B
Modulation	Load Modulation	Load Modulation
Bit Coding (Modulation)	OOK (On-Off Keying)	BPSK (Binary Phase Shift Keying)
Subcarrier Frequency	847 kHz	847 kHz
Bit Coding (Data)	Manchester	NRZ (Non-Return-to-Zero)
Data Rate	106 kbps	106 kbps

== Physical size ==
Part 1 of the standard specifies that the card shall be compliant with ISO/IEC 7810 or ISO/IEC 15457-1, or "an object of any other dimension".

== Notable implementations ==
- Ventra cards used in bus and trains
- MIFARE cards (partial or full implementation, depending on product)
- Biometric passports
- EMV payment cards (PayPass, Visa payWave, ExpressPay)
- National identity cards in the European Economic Area
- Near Field Communication is based on in part, and is compatible with, ISO/IEC 14443
  - Contactless FIDO authenticators use ISO 14443
- Calypso, open security standard for transit fare collection systems
- CIPURSE, open security standard for transit fare collection systems
- Nabaztag:tag uses z:tamp and nano:ztag ISO/IEC 14443 Type B.

== See also ==
- ISO/IEC 7816, "with contact" smart card standard
- ISO/IEC 15693, another protocol for NFC cards
- ISO/IEC 18000, another protocol for NFC cards
- International Civil Aviation Organization § Standards
- List of ISO standards
- FeliCa
