= John R. Wiegand =

German-born American physicist (1912–1986)

- Born: February 23, 1912
- Died: December 1986 (aged 73–74)
- Known for: Wiegand effect
- Scientific career
- Fields: Electrical engineering

John Richard Wiegand (February 23, 1912 – December 1986) was a German-born American inventor associated with the development of the Wiegand effect, a magnetic switching phenomenon used in sensing and identification technologies.

== Biography ==
According to Machine Design, Wiegand was born in Germany in 1912 and came to the United States in the 1930s. He studied piano and choral conducting at the Juilliard School of Music in New York, later became interested in audio amplifiers, and subsequently worked as an engineering assistant for magnetic amplifiers at Bell Telephone Laboratory. In 1944 he began work for Sperry Gyroscope Company in Lake Success, New York, and later worked for a government contractor as a tape-recorder product developer. In 1965, while employed as an electronics technician at Echlin Manufacturing Corporation in Branford, Connecticut, he began the magnetic research that led to the effect bearing his name.

Wiegand died in December 1986. Regina Wiegand's obituary states that she was predeceased by her husband, John Wiegand, in 1986.

== Wiegand effect ==
The Wiegand effect is a magnetic phenomenon observed in specially processed ferromagnetic wire, commonly called Wiegand wire. Machine Design describes the wire as an iron-alloy wire treated to form a hard outer shell around a soft inner core. When exposed to an external magnetic field, the wire undergoes an abrupt magnetic polarity switch that produces a distinct voltage pulse.

The same source notes that the effect was discovered in the 1970s and that the resulting pulse-generating behaviour made the wire useful in a range of sensing and motion applications.

== Patents and applications ==
Wiegand patented a number of inventions relating to pulse generators and magnetic switching devices based on bistable ferromagnetic wire technology, including the following United States patents:

- "US3780313A - Pulse generator". Google Patents.
- "US3892118A - Magnetic switching device". Google Patents.
- "US4247601A". Google Patents.
- "US4263523A". Google Patents.
- "US4309628A". Google Patents.
- "US4484090A". Google Patents.

Machine Design reports that Wiegand later worked with Milton Velinsky and formed Wiegand Electronics to develop applications for the Wiegand effect. It also describes uses of Wiegand wire in sensing, motion applications, and related engineering systems.

== Legacy ==
The Wiegand effect became associated with magnetic sensing and identification technologies, and Wiegand wire continued to be discussed in engineering literature decades after its development.

== See also ==
- Wiegand effect
- Wiegand interface
