= Wiegand sensor =

Type of magnetic sensor

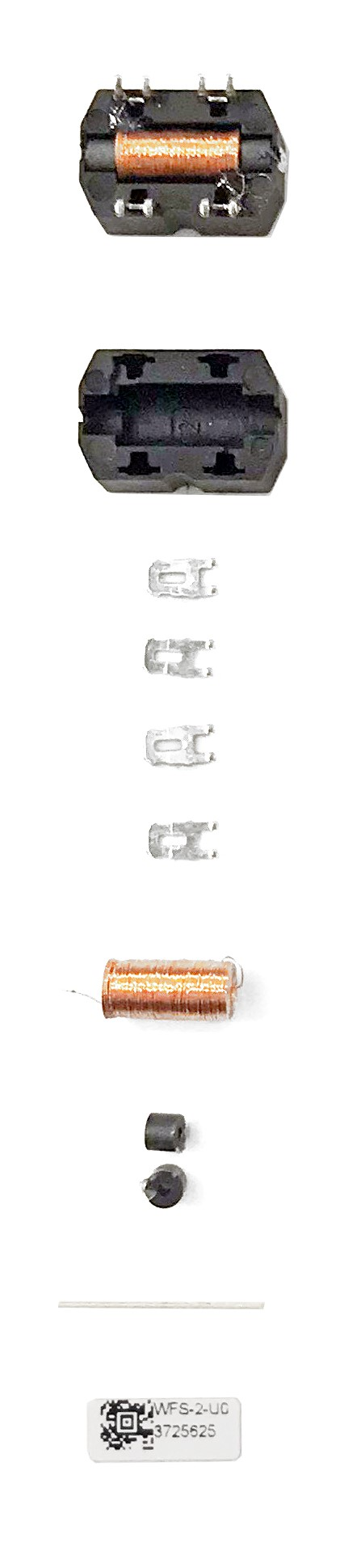
A Wiegand Sensor and the parts it is made of, including the wrapped coil and the Vicalloy wire.

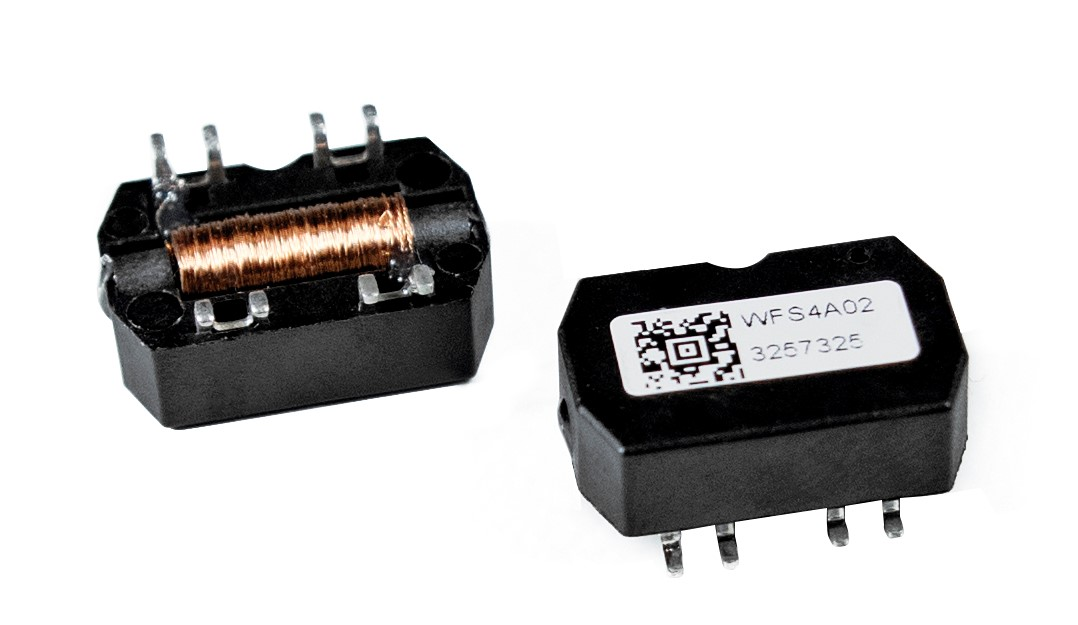
A Wiegand Sensor.

Wiegand sensors are magnetic sensors that do not need any external voltage or current, and make use of the Wiegand effect to generate a consistent pulse every time magnetic field polarity reverses. Wiegand sensors are made by wrapping a coil around a Vicalloy wire core, which, due to the hysteresis inherent in the Wiegand effect, induces a pulse in the coil each time the magnetic polarity of the Vicalloy wire core reverses. They can be used in a range of magnetic sensing applications and have the additional advantage that the energy of each pulse can be harvested.

== Energy harvesting ==
The consistency of the pulses produced by Wiegand sensors can also be used to provide energy for ultra-low power electronics to be operated using a single pulse. In addition, successive pulses can be stored to offset energy demand of low-power energy circuits. Alternatively, the pulses can be used to trigger, or ‘wake-up’, intermittently powered electronic circuits.

In certain applications, both functions of the pulses (magnetic sensing and energy harvesting) are exploited. The pulse energy is used to power ultra-low power circuitry or ICs which, in turn, use the timing of the pulses to perform calculation tasks (e.g. count event data).

== Applications ==
Typical applications fall into three main categories; pulse generation applications, power transmission applications and combined sensing and energy harvesting applications.

=== Pulse generation ===
As a reliable source of consistently timed pulses, Wiegand sensors are used in industrial and commercial flow-metering applications (e.g. water and gas), and also to calculate rotation speed in tachometers (e.g. high-speed trains).

=== Power transmission ===
By placing the Wiegand sensor within an oscillating electro-magnetic fields (e.g. from a Helmholtz coil), Wiegand sensors can be used to provide energy for low power applications in environments where high frequency transmission is challenging (e.g. transcutaneous power for medical devices).

=== Sensing and energy harvesting ===
Wiegand sensors are commonly used in ‘Batteryless’ rotary encoder technology for self-powered revolution counting. Harnessing both the timing of the pulses and the pulse energy, such rotary encoders provide reliable multiturn counting even in the absence of external power or batteries.
