= Load modulation =

Load Modulation is a method of sharing information from one device to another by means of modulating the load that the transmitting device imposes on a signal provided by the receiving device.

This is used, for example, to allow ISO/IEC 14443 and ISO/IEC 15693 NFC cards to reply to the reading device without the need for the NFC card to contain a power source. Instead, it is powered by the magnetic field provided by the reader, conveying its data back to the reader by switching a resistor or capacitor in and out of its antenna circuit, thus modulating the load that the card imposes upon the reader's field.
