= Smart card application protocol data unit =

Communication unit between a reader and a smart card

In the context of smart cards, an application protocol data unit (APDU) is the communication unit between a smart card reader and a smart card. The structure of the APDU is defined by ISO/IEC 7816-4 Organization, security and commands for interchange.

== APDU message command-response pair ==
There are two categories of APDUs: command APDUs and response APDUs. A command APDU is sent by the reader to the card – it contains a mandatory 4-byte header (CLA, INS, P1, P2) and from 0 to 65 535 bytes of data. A response APDU is sent by the card to the reader – it contains from 0 to 65 536 bytes of data, and 2 mandatory status bytes (SW1, SW2).

Command APDU
Field name	Length (bytes)	Description
CLA	1	Instruction class - indicates the type of command, e.g., interindustry or proprietary
INS	1	Instruction code - indicates the specific command, e.g., "select", "write data"
P1-P2	2	Instruction parameters for the command, e.g., offset into file at which to write the data
L_{c}	0, 1 or 3	Encodes the number (N_{c}) of bytes of command data to follow 0 bytes denotes N_{c}=0; 1 byte with a value from 1 to 255 denotes N_{c} with the same length 3 bytes, the first of which must be 0, denotes N_{c} in the range 1 to 65 535 (all three bytes may not be zero)
Command data	N_{c}	N_{c} bytes of data
L_{e}	0, 1, 2 or 3	Encodes the maximum number (N_{e}) of response bytes expected 0 bytes denotes N_{e}=0; 1 byte in the range 1 to 255 denotes that value of N_{e}, or 0 denotes N_{e}=256; 2 bytes (if extended L_{c} was present in the command) in the range 1 to 65 535 denotes N_{e} of that value, or two zero bytes denotes 65 536; 3 bytes (if L_{c} was not present in the command), the first of which must be 0, denote N_{e} in the same way as two-byte L_{e}
Response APDU
Response data	N_{r} (at most N_{e})	Response data
SW1-SW2 (Response trailer)	2	Command processing status, e.g., 90 00 (hexadecimal) indicates success

== See also ==
- Protocol data unit
