= Vicalloy =

Family of cobalt-iron-vanadium alloys

Vicalloy is a family of cobalt-iron-vanadium wrought ferromagnetic alloys which have high coercivity and are used to make permanent magnets and other magnetic components. Vicalloy is precipitation hardened and can be formed by a number of cold working techniques. It is commonly used in electromechanical device applications, such as Wiegand wires because it shows a large Wiegand effect.

It consists of 52% cobalt, 10% vanadium, trace amounts of elements such as carbon and manganese, and balance (~37%) iron.

Its magnetic maximum energy product BH_{max} is 1 MGOe when cast and as high as 3.5 MGOe when appropriately cold worked.

'Vicalloy' was used in hysteresis motors both in solid and laminated form (for higher frequency applications) by Vactric Ltd and Walter Jones Ltd - neither company still exist- using material produced and processed by Telcon Ltd (now owned by Carpenter Technology Corporation) from about 2008. 'Electrical Times' published an article 'Magnetic Alloys for Hysteresis Motors' by D.R. Driver on 10 August 1967 which includes some magnetic characteristics of Vicalloy and P6 alloy. Work on applications in hysteresis motors was done at Aston University, UK, (the late Nick Capoldi who joined Smiths Industries) and The Electrical Research Association, UK, (Tasker and Bradford), amongst others.
