= ISO/IEC 15693 =

ISO standard

ISO/IEC 15693, is an ISO/IEC standard for Contactless vicinity objects (vicinity cards and security devices ), i.e. objects which can be read from a greater distance as compared with proximity cards. Such cards can normally be read out by a reader without being powered themselves, as the reader will supply the necessary power to the card over the air (wireless).

ISO/IEC 15693 systems operate at the 13.56 MHz frequency, and offer maximum read distance of 1 meter. As the vicinity cards have to operate at a greater distance, the necessary magnetic field is less (0.15 to 5 A/m) than that for a proximity card (1.5 to 7.5 A/m). ISO/IEC 15693 is called contactless long-range standard with a lower RF speed compared to some other RFID standard such as ISO/IEC 14443.

== Standard ==
The standard is developed by ISO/IEC JTC 1 (Joint Technical Committee 1) / SC 17 (Subcommittee 17) ..

- ISO/IEC 15693-1:2018 Part 1: Physical characteristics
- ISO/IEC 15693-2:2019 Part 2: Air interface and initialization
- ISO/IEC 15693-3:2026 Part 3: Anticollision and transmission protocol

== Communication to the card ==
Communication from the reader to the card uses an amplitude-shift keying with 10% or 100% modulation index.

The data coding is:

1 out of 4 pulse-position modulation
2 bits are coded as the position of a 9.44 μs pause in a 75.52 μs symbol time, giving a bit rate of 26.48 kilobits per second. The least-significant bits are sent first.
1 out of 256 pulse-position modulation
8 bits are coded as the position of a 9.44 μs pause in a 4.833 ms symbol time, giving a bit rate of 1.65 kbit/s.

== Communication to the reader ==
The card has two ways to send its data back to the reader. Both use a subcarrier transmitted back to the reader using load modulation.

=== Amplitude-shift keying ===
Amplitude-shift keying 100% modulation index on a 423.75 kHz subcarrier. The data rate can be:

- Low 6.62 kbit/s (fc/2048)
- High 26.48 kbit/s (fc/512)

A logic 0 starts with eight pulses of 423.75 kHz followed by an unmodulated time of 18.88 μs (256/ fc); a logic 1 is the other way round. The data frame delimiters are code violations, a start of frame is:

1. an unmodulated time of 56.64 μs (768/ fc),
2. 24 pulses of 423.75 kHz
3. a logic 1

and the end of a frame is:

1. a logic 0
2. 24 pulses of 423.75 kHz
3. an unmodulated time of 56.64 μs

The data are sent using a Manchester code.

=== Frequency-shift keying ===
Frequency-shift keying by switching between a 423.75 kHz sub carrier (operating frequency divided by 32) and a 484.25 kHz sub carrier (operating frequency divided by 28). The data rate can be:

- Low 6.67 kbit/s (fc/2032)
- High 26.69 kbit/s (fc/508)

A logic 0 starts with eight pulses of 423.75 kHz followed by nine pulses of 484.28 kHz; a logic 1 is the other way round. The data frame delimiters are code violations, a start of frame is:

1. 27 pulses of 484.28 kHz
2. 24 pulses of 423.75 kHz
3. a logic 1

and the end of a frame is:

1. a logic 0
2. 24 pulses of 423.75 kHz
3. 27 pulses of 484.28 kHz

The data are sent using a Manchester code.

== Manufacturer codes ==
see ISO/IEC 7816-6

1. Code 0x01: Motorola (UK)
2. Code 0x02: STMicroelectronics SA (FR)
3. Code 0x03: Hitachi Ltd (JP)
4. Code 0x04: NXP Semiconductors (DE)
5. Code 0x05: Infineon Technologies AG (DE)
6. Code 0x06: Cylink (US)
7. Code 0x07: Texas Instruments (FR)
8. Code 0x08: Fujitsu Limited (JP)
9. Code 0x09: Matsushita Electronics Corporation, Semiconductor Company (JP)
10. Code 0x0A: NEC (JP)
11. Code 0x0B: Oki Electric Industry Co Ltd (JP)
12. Code 0x0C: Toshiba Corp (JP)
13. Code 0x0D: Mitsubishi Electric Corp (JP)
14. Code 0x0E: Samsung Electronics Co Ltd (KR)
15. Code 0x0F: Hynix (KR)
16. Code 0x10: LG-Semiconductors Co Ltd (KR)
17. Code 0x11: Emosyn-EM Microelectronics (US)
18. Code 0x12: INSIDE Technology (FR)
19. Code 0x13: ORGA Kartensysteme GmbH (DE)
20. Code 0x14: Sharp Corporation (JP)
21. Code 0x15: ATMEL (FR)
22. Code 0x16: EM Microelectronic-Marin (CH)
23. Code 0x17: SMARTRAC TECHNOLOGY GmbH (DE)
24. Code 0x18: ZMD AG (DE)
25. Code 0x19: XICOR Inc (US)
26. Code 0x1A: Sony Corporation (JP)
27. Code 0x1B: Malaysia Microelectronic Solutions Sdn Bhd (MY)
28. Code 0x1C: Emosyn (US)
29. Code 0x1D: Shanghai Fudan Microelectronics Co Ltd (CN)
30. Code 0x1E: Magellan Technology Pty Limited (AU)
31. Code 0x1F: Melexis NV BO (CH)
32. Code 0x20: Renesas Technology Corp (JP)
33. Code 0x21: TAGSYS (FR)
34. Code 0x22: Transcore (US)
35. Code 0x23: Shanghai Belling Corp Ltd (CN)
36. Code 0x24: Masktech Germany GmbH (DE)
37. Code 0x25: Innovision Research and Technology Plc (UK)
38. Code 0x26: Hitachi ULSI Systems Co Ltd (JP)
39. Code 0x27: Yubico AB (SE)
40. Code 0x28: Ricoh (JP)
41. Code 0x29: ASK (FR)
42. Code 0x2A: Unicore Microsystems LLC (RU)
43. Code 0x2B: Dallas semiconductor/Maxim (US)
44. Code 0x2C: Impinj Inc (US)
45. Code 0x2D: RightPlug Alliance (US)
46. Code 0x2E: Broadcom Corporation (US)
47. Code 0x2F: MStar Semiconductor Inc (TW)
48. Code 0x30: BeeDar Technology Inc (US)
49. Code 0x31: RFIDsec (DK)
50. Code 0x32: Schweizer Electronic AG (DE)
51. Code 0x33: AMIC Technology Corp (TW)
52. Code 0x34: Mikron JSC (RU)
53. Code 0x35: Fraunhofer Institute for Photonic Microsystems (DE)
54. Code 0x36: IDS Microship AG (CH)
55. Code 0x37: Kovio (US)
56. Code 0x38: HMT Microelectronic Ltd (CH)
57. Code 0x39: Silicon Craft Technology (TH)
58. Code 0x3A: Advanced Film Device Inc. (JP)
59. Code 0x3B: Nitecrest Ltd (UK)
60. Code 0x3C: Verayo Inc. (US)
61. Code 0x3D: HID Global (US)
62. Code 0x3E: Productivity Engineering Gmbh (DE)
63. Code 0x3F: Austriamicrosystems AG (reserved) (AT)
64. Code 0x40: Gemalto SA (FR)
65. Code 0x41: Renesas Electronics Corporation (JP)
66. Code 0x42: 3Alogics Inc (KR)
67. Code 0x43: Top TroniQ Asia Limited (Hong Kong)
68. Code 0x44: Gentag Inc (USA)
69. Code 0x45: Invengo Information Technology Co.Ltd (CN)
70. Code 0x46: Guangzhou Sysur Microelectronics, Inc (CN)
71. Code 0x47: CEITEC S.A. (BR)
72. Code 0x48: Shanghai Quanray Electronics Co. Ltd. (CN)
73. Code 0x49: MediaTek Inc (TW)
74. Code 0x4A: Angstrem PJSC (RU)
75. Code 0x4B: Celisic Semiconductor (Hong Kong) Limited (CN)
76. Code 0x4C: LEGIC Identsystems AG (CH)
77. Code 0x4D: Balluff GmbH (DE)
78. Code 0x4E: Oberthur Technologies (FR)
79. Code 0x4F: Silterra Malaysia Sdn. Bhd. (MY)
80. Code 0x50: DELTA Danish Electronics, Light & Acoustics (DK)
81. Code 0x51: Giesecke & Devrient GmbH (DE)
82. Code 0x52: Shenzhen China Vision Microelectronics Co., Ltd. (CN)
83. Code 0x53: Shanghai Feiju Microelectronics Co. Ltd. (CN)
84. Code 0x54: Intel Corporation (US)
85. Code 0x55: Microsensys GmbH (DE)
86. Code 0x56: Sonix Technology Co., Ltd. (TW)
87. Code 0x57: Qualcomm Technologies Inc (US)
88. Code 0x58: Realtek Semiconductor Corp (TW)
89. Code 0x59: Freevision Technologies Co. Ltd (CN)
90. Code 0x5A: Giantec Semiconductor Inc. (CN)
91. Code 0x5B: JSC Angstrem-T (RU)
92. Code 0x5C: STARCHIP France
93. Code 0x5D: SPIRTECH (FR)
94. Code 0x5E: GANTNER Electronic GmbH (AT)
95. Code 0x5F: Nordic Semiconductor (NO)
96. Code 0x60: Verisiti Inc (US)
97. Code 0x61: Wearlinks Technology Inc. (CN)
98. Code 0x62: Userstar Information Systems Co., Ltd (TW)
99. Code 0x63: Pragmatic Semiconductor Ltd. (UK)
100. Code 0x64: Associação do Laboratório de Sistemas Integráveis Tecnológico – LSI-TEC (BR)
101. Code 0x65: Tendyron Corporation (CN)
102. Code 0x66: MUTO Smart Co., Ltd.(KR)
103. Code 0x67: ON Semiconductor (US)
104. Code 0x68: TÜBİTAK BİLGEM (TR)
105. Code 0x69: Huada Semiconductor Co., Ltd (CN)
106. Code 0x6A: SEVENEY (FR)
107. Code 0x6B: ISSM (FR)
108. Code 0x6C: Wisesec Ltd (IL)
109. Code 0x7E: Holtek (TW)

== Products with ISO/IEC 15693 interface ==
- EEPROM: various manufacturers like ST Microelectronics or NXP offer EEPROMs readable via ISO/IEC 15693.
- μController: Texas Instruments offers a small μController entirely powered by the ISO/IEC 15693 reading field and capable of reading a simple temperature sensor, wirelessly providing the value of that to the reader.
