= Keycard lock =

Lock opened with a plastic keycard

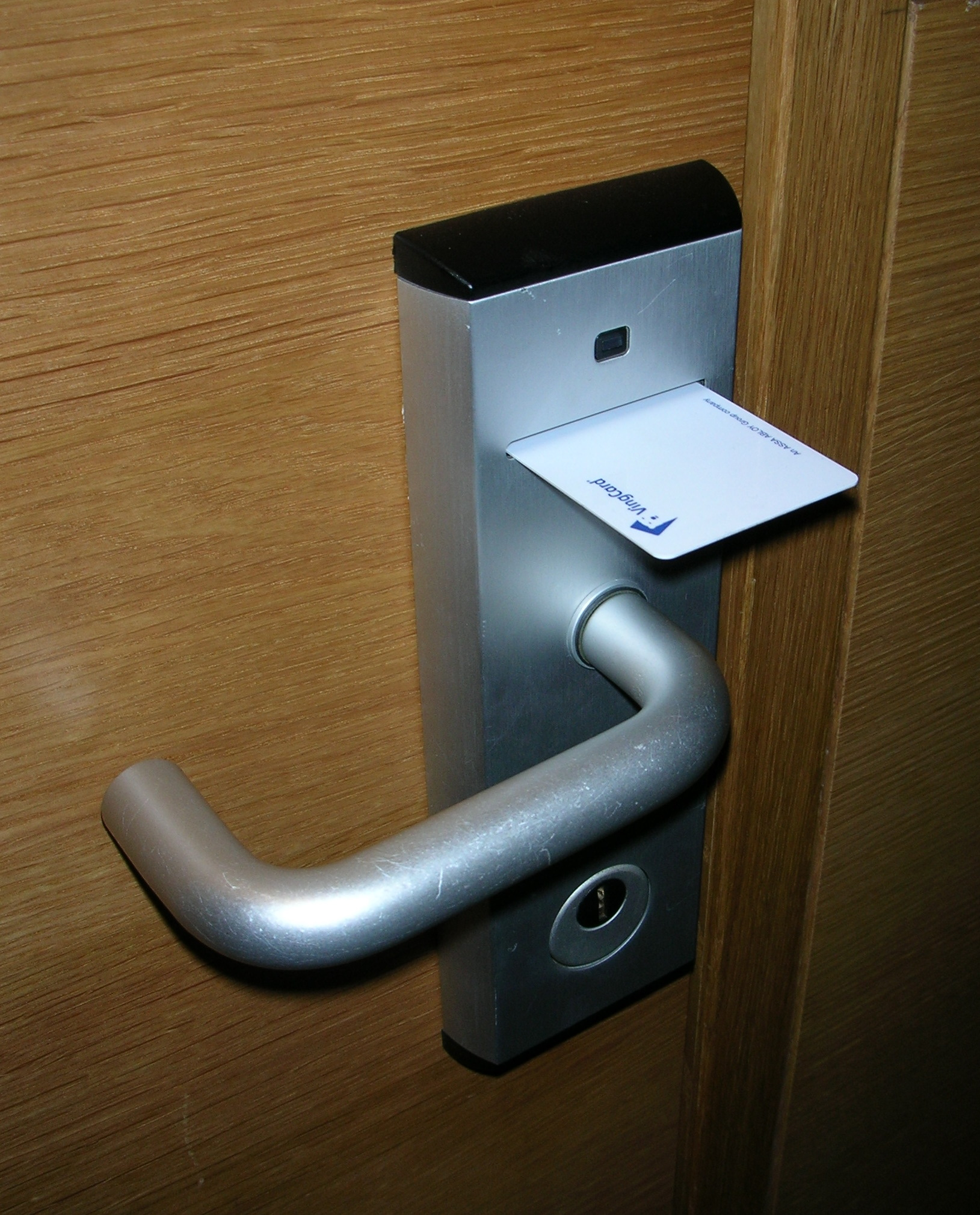
A keycard lock used for entry into a hotel room.

A keycard lock is a lock operated by a keycard, a flat, rectangular plastic card. The card typically, but not always, has identical dimensions to that of a credit card, that is ID-1 format. The card stores a physical or digital pattern that the door mechanism accepts before disengaging the lock. Tor Sørnes was credited with the invention in the 1970s.

There are several common types of keycards in use, including the mechanical holecard, barcode, magnetic stripe, Wiegand wire embedded cards, smart card (embedded with a read/write electronic microchip), RFID, and NFC proximity cards.

Keycards are frequently used in hotels as an alternative to mechanical keys.

The first commercial use of key cards was to raise and lower the gate at automated parking lots where users paid a monthly fee.

== Overview ==
Keycard systems operate by physically moving detainers in the locking mechanism with the insertion of the card, by shining LEDs through a pattern of holes in the card and detecting the result, by swiping or inserting a magnetic stripe card, or in the case of RFID or NFC cards, merely being brought into close proximity to a sensor. Keycards may also serve as ID cards, or as part of an NFC system, have the code transmitted to a mobile phone to be placed into a digital wallet system such as Apple Wallet or Google Wallet, negating the need for a physical keycard.

Many electronic access control locks use a Wiegand interface to connect the card swipe mechanism to the rest of the electronic entry system.

Newer keycard systems use radio-frequency identification (RFID) technology such as the TLJ infinity.

== Types of card readers ==
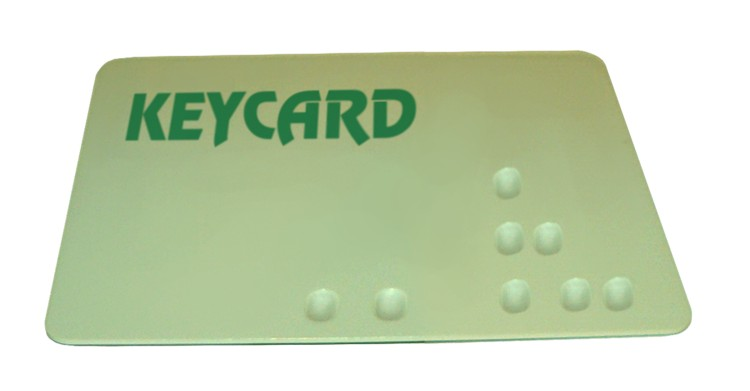
A mechanical keycard, with "bumps" that operate pins inside of the lock (similar to a pin tumbler lock)

=== Mechanical ===
Mechanical keycard locks employ detainers which must be arranged in pre-selected positions by the key before the bolt will move. This was a mechanical type of lock operated by a plastic key card with a pattern of holes. There were 32 positions for possible hole locations, giving approximately 4.3 billion different keys. The key could easily be changed for each new guest by inserting a new key template in the lock that matched the new key.

In the early 1980s, the key card lock was electrified with LEDs that detected the holes.

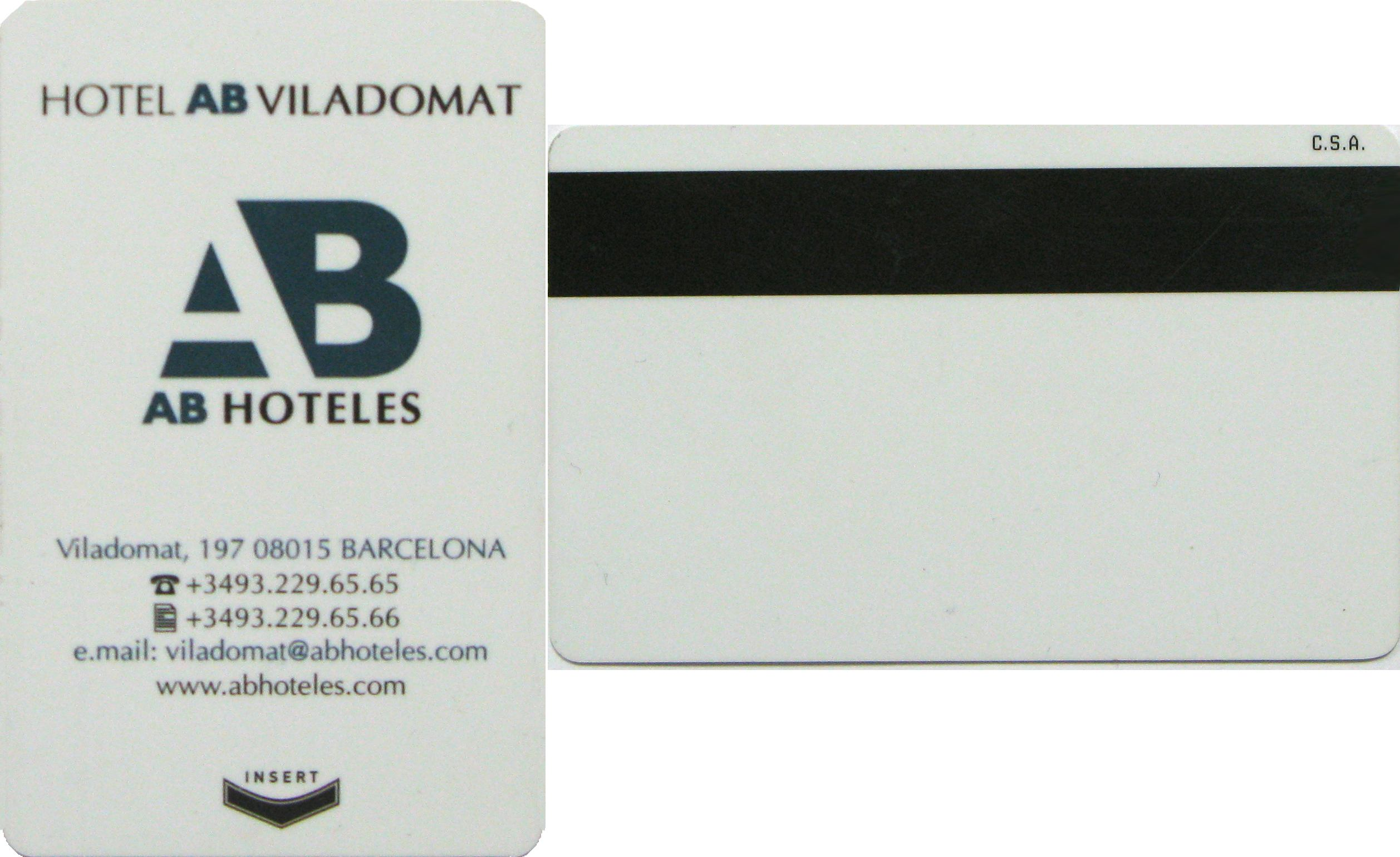
A keycard with a magnetic stripe

=== Wiegand cards ===
Since the keycode is permanently set into the card at manufacture by the positions of magnetic wires, Wiegand cards cannot be erased by magnetic fields or reprogrammed as magnetic stripe cards can. Many electronic access control locks use a Wiegand interface to connect the card swipe mechanism to the rest of the electronic entry system.

=== Magnetic stripe ===
Magnetic stripe (sometimes "strip") based keycard locks function by running the magnetic stripe over a sensor that reads the contents of the stripe. The stripe's contents are compared to those either stored locally in the lock or those of a central system. Some centralized systems operate using hardwired connections to central controllers while others use various frequencies of radio waves to communicate with the central controllers. Some have the feature of a mechanical (traditional key) bypass in case of loss of power.

=== Passive RFID ===
RFID cards contain a small chip and induction loop which the transmitter on the keycard reader can access. The main advantages with RFID cards is that they do not need to be removed from the wallet or pass holder - as the keycard reader can usually read them from a few inches away.

== Access control ==
In the case of the hotel room lock, there is no central system; the keycard and the lock function in the same tradition as a standard key and lock. However, if the card readers communicate with a central system, it is the system that unlocks the door, not the card reader alone. Modern electronic access control providers offer keycard-based locking systems for residential, hospitality, and commercial applications. These systems may integrate technologies such as RFID, NFC, keypad authentication, and mobile credentials to manage access permissions and reduce reliance on traditional mechanical keys. This allows for more control over the locks; for example, a specific card may only work on certain days of the week or time of day. Which locks can be opened by a card can be changed at any time. Logs are often kept of which cards unlocked doors at what times.

== Privacy ==
Computerized authentication systems, such as key cards, raise privacy concerns, since they enable computer surveillance of each entry. RFID cards and key fobs are becoming increasingly popular due to their ease of use. Many modern households have installed digital locks that make use of key cards, in combination with biometric fingerprint and keypad PIN options. Offices have also slowly installed digital locks that integrate with key cards and biometric technology.

== Gallery ==
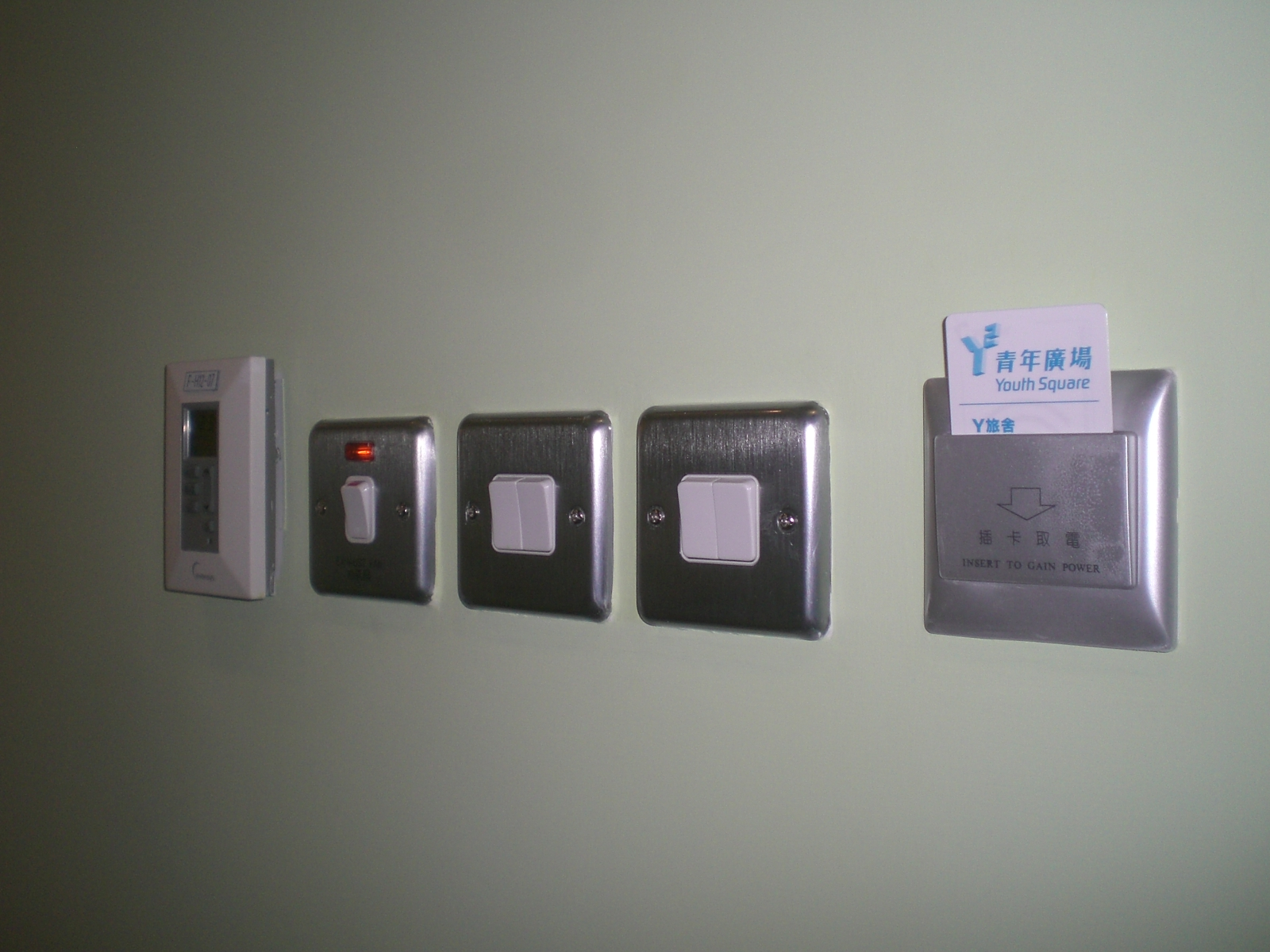
A hotel entry card used to enable a light switch

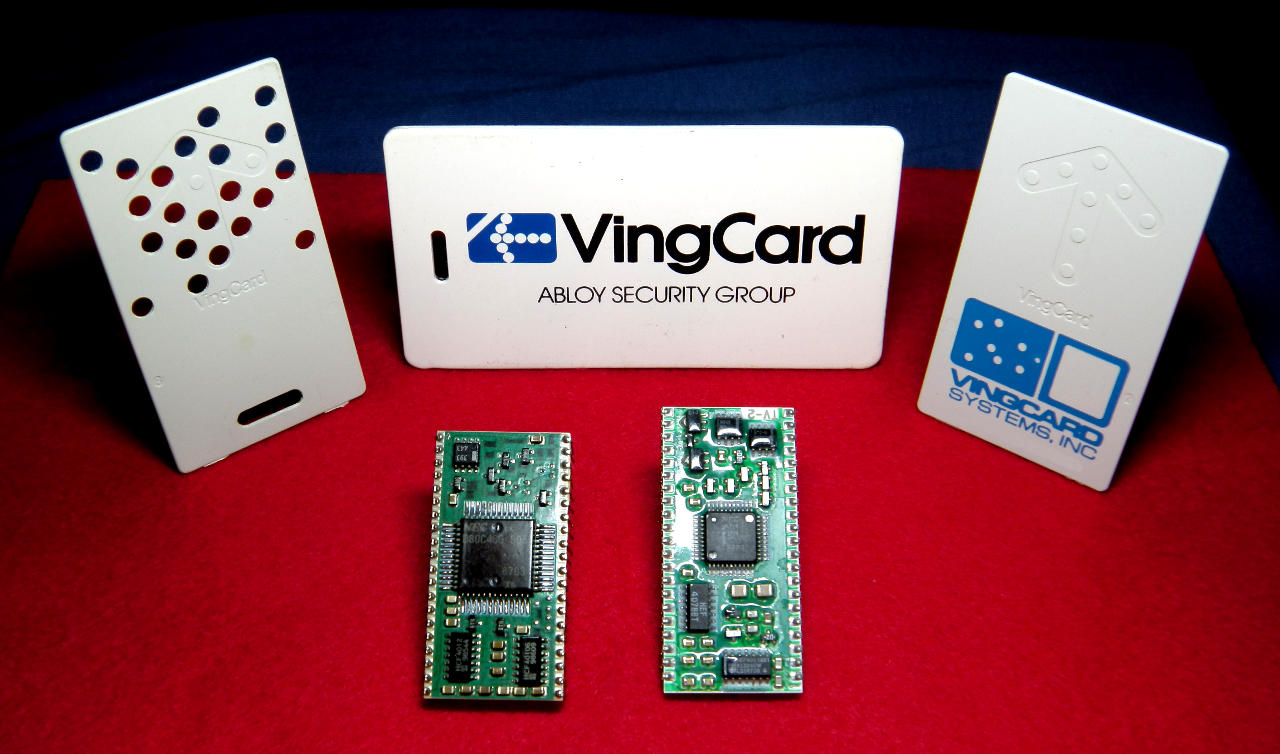
Vingcard Systems 1080 and 1090 electronic optical keycard modules

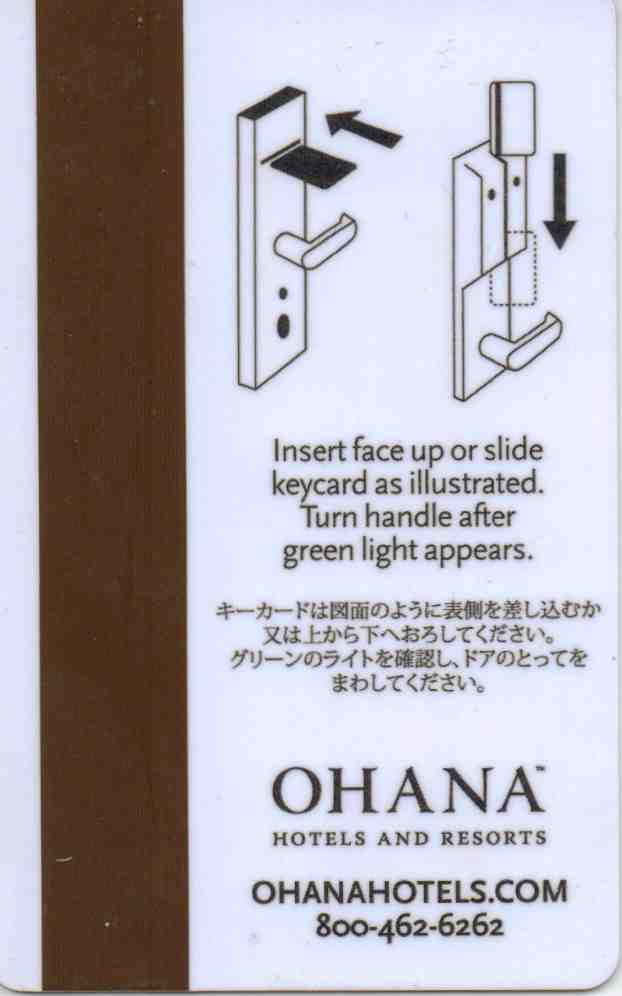
Illustrated instructions for use of mag stripe key card

== Environmental impact and alternatives ==
In response to growing environmental concerns and hotel ESG initiatives, manufacturers have developed alternatives to plastic key cards.

== See also ==
- Access control
