= ISO/IEC 7810 =

Standard for ID cards

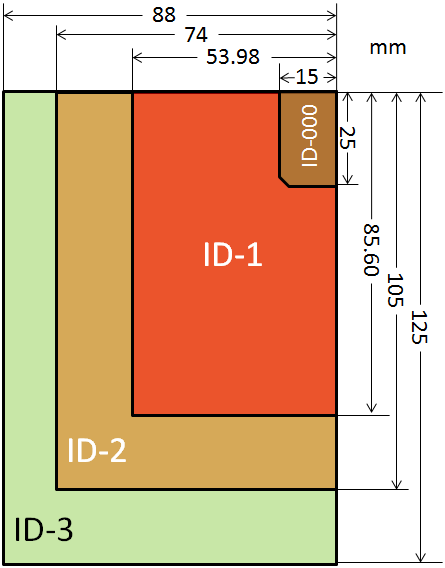
Illustration of ISO/IEC 7810 sizes in millimetres

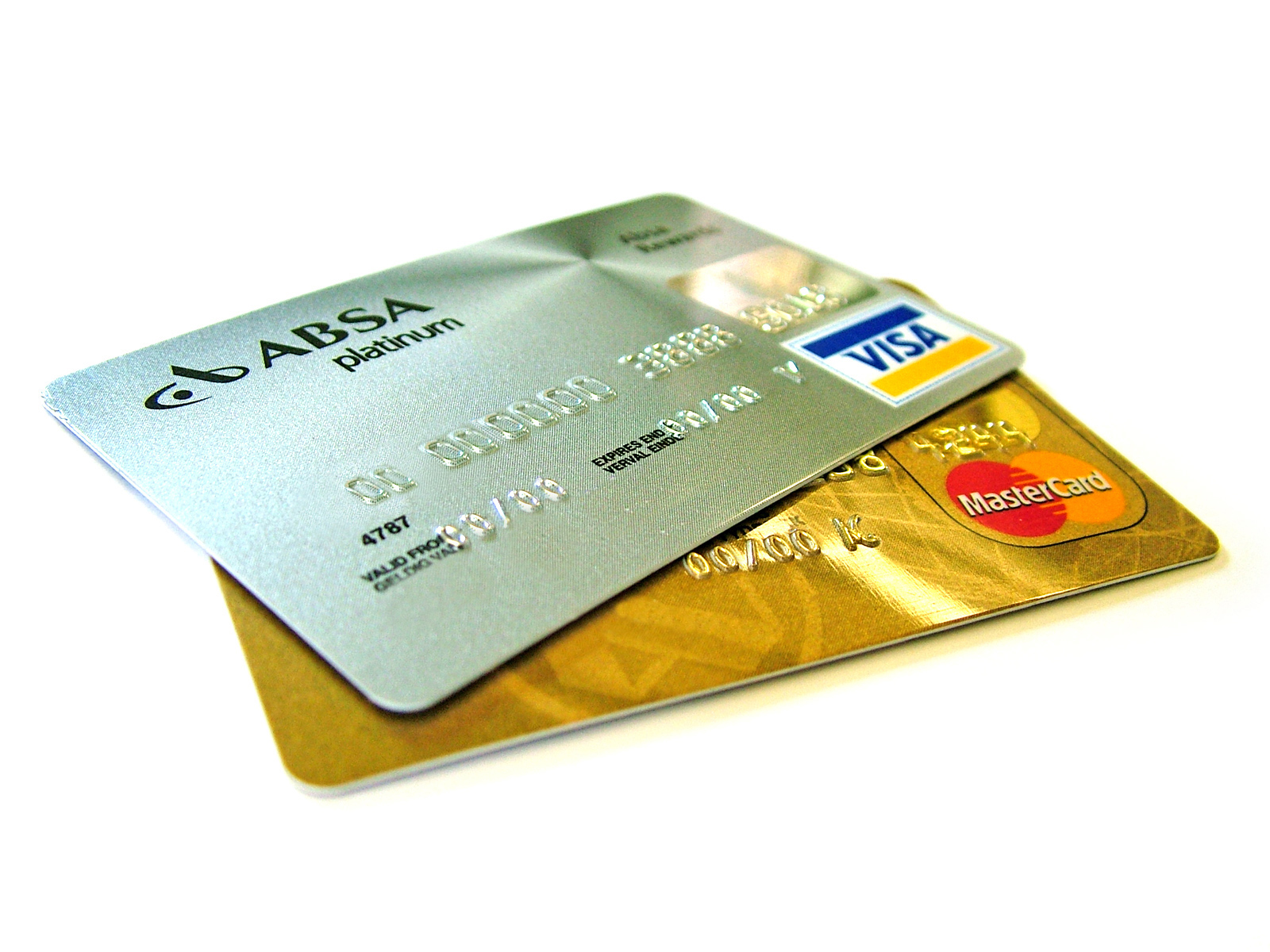
Payment cards commonly use the ISO/IEC 7810 ID-1 format.

ISO/IEC 7810 Identification cards — Physical characteristics is an international standard that defines the physical characteristics for identification cards.

The characteristics specified include:

- Physical dimensions
- Resistance to bending, chemicals, temperature, and humidity
- Toxicity

The standard includes test methods for resistance to heat.

== Card sizes ==
The standard defines four card sizes: ID-1, ID-2, ID-3 and ID-000.

ISO / IEC 7810 sizes
Format	Dimensions		Usage
Format	mm	inch	Usage
ID-1	85.60 × 53.98	3.370 × 2.125	Most banking cards and ID cards. Size may also be referred to as CR-80 or TD1.
ID-2	105 × 74	4.134 × 2.913	Older-style ID cards. Visas.
ID-3	125 × 88	4.921 × 3.465	Passport booklets
ID-000	25 × 15	0.984 × 0.591	Mini-SIM cards

All card sizes have a thickness of 760±80 μm, i.e. minimum 0.68 millimetres (0.027 in) and maximum 0.84 millimetres (0.033 in).

The standard defines both metric and imperial measurements, noting that:

Numeric values in the SI and/or Imperial measurement system [...] may have been rounded off and therefore are consistent with, but not exactly equal to, each other. Either system may be used, but the two should not be intermixed or reconverted. The original design was made using the Imperial measurement system.

=== ID-1 ===
The ID-1 format specifies a size of 85.60 by 53.98 millimetres (3 3/8 in × 2 1/8 in) and rounded corners with a radius of 2.88–3.48 mm (about 1/8 in). This format is also referred to as CR-80 and, for travel documents, TD1. It is commonly used for payment cards (ATM cards, credit cards, debit cards, etc.). Today it is also used for driving licences and personal identity cards in many countries, automated fare collection system cards for public transport, in retail loyalty cards, and even crew member certificates (particularly for aircrew). As of 2024, all European standard identity cards are issued in the ID-1 format.

=== ID-2 ===
The ID-2 format is 105 by 74 millimetres (4 1/8 in × 2 15/16 in), and travel documents in this format are also referred to as TD2. This length and width are those of A7 paper. The ID-2 format is used, for example, for visas. It was previously used for the Romanian, Icelandic, German, French and many other identity cards. ID-2 was previously also used for driving licences (including Finnish, Swedish and Icelandic) before those changed to the ID-1 format.

=== ID-3 ===
The ID-3 format is 125 by 88 millimetres (4 15/16 in × 3 7/16 in), and travel documents in this format are also referred to as TD3. This length and width are those of B7 paper. This format is commonly used for passport booklets.

=== ID-000 ===
ID-000 specifies a size of 25 by 15 millimetres (1 in × 9/16 in), with one corner slightly (3 mm or 1/8 in) bevelled. The ID-000 size was first defined by ENV 1375–1, Identification card systems — Intersector integrated circuit(s) card additional formats — Part 1: ID-000 card size and physical characteristics.

This size is used for the mini-SIM format, the second-generation format of Subscriber Identity Modules.

=== ID-000 size card as part of ID-1 size card ===
An "informative" (i.e. non-mandatory) annex describes how an ID-000 sized card may be included in an ID-1 size card for processing (e.g. in an ID-1 reader), but with "relief areas around the perimeter of the ID-000 size card to allow it to be removed from the ID-1 size card without punching tools". An ID-1 size card containing an ID-000 size card is denoted as ID-1/000. This was the common design of SIMs when mini-SIMs were common, usually being issued as standard SIMs, i.e. in ID-1 format, with a removable ID-000 section that, when removed, was a mini-SIM.

== Card characteristics ==
The standard specifies requirements for such physical characteristics as:

- Bending stiffness
- Toxicity
- Resistance to chemicals
- Card dimensional stability and warpage with temperature and humidity
- Resistance to deterioration from exposure to light and heat
- Durability

== See also ==
- ISO/IEC 7811 defines traditional techniques for recording data on ID-1 identification cards, namely embossed characters and several different magnetic recording formats.
- ISO/IEC 7816 defines ID-1 identification cards with an embedded chip (smartcard) and contact surfaces for power, clock, reset and serial-data signals.
- Machine-readable passport (ICAO 9303) defines machine-readable text on ID-1, ID-2, and ID-3 travel documents.
- Magnetic stripe card
- MM Code
