= Sørnes (surname) =

Sørnes is a Norwegian surname. Notable people with the surname include:

- Rasmus Sørnes (1893–1967), Norwegian clockmaker and inventor
- Tor Sørnes (1925–2017), Norwegian inventor, writer and politician
- Sverre Sørnes (born 1945), Norwegian long-distance runner
- Torgrim Sørnes (born 1956), Norwegian physician, historian and author
