= Rasmus Sørnes =

Norwegian clockmaker

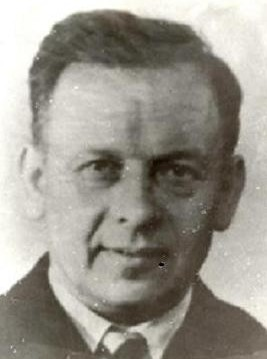
- Rasmus Sørnes
- Born: March 22, 1893; Sola, Rogaland
- Died: 15 February 1967 (aged 73); Jeløy, Østfold
- Education: Stavanger Technical School
- Occupation: Radio Technician
- Known for: Clockmaking
- Spouse: Gunhild Serina Kvæven
- Children: 6

Rasmus Jonassen Sørnes (22 March 1893 – 15 February 1967) was a Norwegian inventor, clockmaker and radio technician, and is most famous for his advanced astronomical clocks, the most precise of which has an inaccuracy of 7 seconds during 1000 years. During his lifetime, Sørnes also designed and built a large variety of agricultural, radio-technical and mechanical devices, only a few of them patented.

== Early life and education ==
Rasmus Sørnes was born in Sola in Norway on 22 March 1893 from a mediocre background, his parents were farmers with limited resources. He was the oldest of four brothers and one sister. His mother died shortly after the birth of the sister, and his father brought up the children by himself. According to his sister, he was already as a young boy very creative and industrious, at least when it came to his own ideas. He was less eager if he had to work with ideas from others, and it often happened that he skipped school for a day or two if he was working on something interesting. In spite of this, his grades were very good.

After finishing elementary school, Sørnes applied to be a watchmaker apprentice in Stavanger, but was rejected on the grounds that he was a farmer son with big hands and lumpy fingers. The bitterness over this rejection followed him throughout his life. Sørnes started his career assembling bikes at a bicycle factory. The job was boring and repetitious and he only lasted six months. The next job was in a mechanical workshop in Stavanger, where he stayed for about a year. At the age of 18 or 19, Sørnes was hired as an electrician apprentice, and in two years he earned a certificate as an electrician from Stavanger Technical School. Sørnes was a man of modest education, but he was self-taught in a variety of scientific trades and technological disciplines, including advanced mathematics, physics, and astronomy. He enjoyed frequent collaboration with university research communities. He lectured on lens-making to optics students and clockmaking to watchmaker students, although he had formal education in neither.

== Early career ==
As a child, he designed and constructed an electrically driven water pump to be used at his parents' farm. In 1910, he designed and built a four-stroke combustion engine complete with electric ignition and water-cooling system and he constructed a turbine power plant.

In 1926, Sørnes built a tractor after his own design, which he based on the German Adler automobile. His tractor, which was meant for use on the family farm, was more advanced and efficient than the Moline tractors available in Jæren at the time. He patented a chicken incubator and a milk/cream separator. In 1913 he patented corrugated diaphragms in loudspeakers for better sound quality. While commercial industry was uninterested in this feature for the lifetime of the patent, this has in modern times become standard in loudspeaker design.

=== As a radio technician ===
In 1922 Sørnes was employed as a technician at the local Ullandhaug Radio Station, and the same year he started his own radio station called "Radio Grannes" which broadcast every night 6:00—8:00 p.m.. This was only two years after the BBC began broadcasting in 1920, and three years before the Norwegian Broadcasting Corporation began its regular broadcasts in 1925. During the broadcasts, he would read news, and his wife would sing. To make sure he got listeners, Sørnes supplied friends and neighbours with receivers. His private station was later shut down by the manager of the power company as he was afraid that the radio station uncontrollably drained off the electricity out into the air.

In 1931, the radio station where he worked was moved to the island of Jeløy, in southeast Norway. In the midst of the Great Depression, unemployment was high and the entire staff had few options but to move along with their employer. Sørnes built a new house on the island and brought his family there one year later. Sørnes equipped the house with an alarm system, lightning protection, a radio mast, and a house phone to his workshop.

During World War II, Sørnes built another radio transmitter for the purpose of clandestine communication, based on his earlier device. The radio he built during the war, was later described as "a masterpiece of technical elegance and intelligent camouflage" by historians. The radio itself is on display in the Norwegian Museum of Science and Technology (Norwegian: Norsk Teknisk Museum) in Oslo. In 1945, the exhibition "The illicit Norway" displayed Sørnes' radio as an example of an ingenious solution. He designed the first automatic model railway in Norway, which was used in a shop window exhibition, and a solar-cell-powered radio-controlled engine for lighthouses.

== Clockmaking ==
Although trained as an electrician and employed as a radio technician, watches and clocks were a source of lifelong fascination for Sørnes. He created four astronomical clocks, with the first two described by himself as "test objects", and the last two his masterpieces.

=== The "Clock No. 1" ===
In the 1937 Sørnes constructed his first astronomical clock, showing standard and Greenwich time, all solar and lunar cycles and phases, the Julian calendar, high and low tides, and sunset/sunrise. The firmament is visualized on a two-dimensional dial, with holes drilled for the larger stars. The dial is illuminated from behind to make the stars visible in the evening. A switch allows the clock to be run forward and backwards in time. The clock is controlled by Sørnes' own invention, an electromagnetic balance wheel escapement. It feeds the system with a constant revolution of one rotation per second and is in this clock powered by two 1.5 V batteries. He experimented with the escapement for many years but eventually resorted to more traditional solutions. The accuracy of the celestial orbits suffered as the calculations were based on regular calendars without full correction of the irregularities. Around at the same time he designed and constructed a large reflecting telescope.

=== The "Clock No. 2" ===
Immediately after finishing clock No. 1, Rasmus Sørnes started working on clock No. 2. It is larger than the first one, but still a mantelpiece clock size. Not much is known about this clock, as it was never fully completed. It is functioning, but without any finish or decoration. While constructing clock No. 2, Sørnes started outlining a larger clock. It seems that clock No. 2 was too small to incorporate all the features he wanted, too inaccurate, or simply too crowded for the necessary maintenance. A perfect astronomical clock must have a perpetual calendar, for example a Gregorian calendar, which is not found in this clock. It incorporates the Julian calendar, which gains 1 day in 128 years. This might sound more than sufficiently accurate for a man's lifetime, but as seen in clock No. 1, Sørnes wanted to be able to run his clocks forwards and backward in time to examine previous and coming events. Another shortcoming is that the sidereal works will slow down 1 minute in 10 years. On the other hand, the error for the Earth's rotation around the sun is only 0.7 seconds per year. This can be compared to the famous astronomical clock in Strasbourg, which has an error of maximum 2 seconds per year. This clock is currently on display at Borgarsyssel Museum in Sarpsborg, Norway.

=== The "Clock No. 3" ===
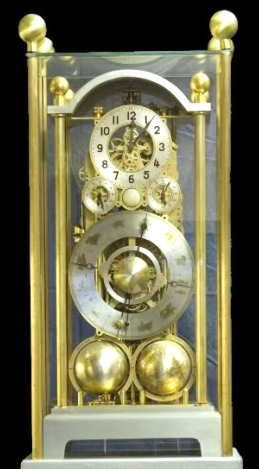
Clock No. 3

Rasmus Sørnes steadily kept improving his design and adding even more features, and in 1954, the 3rd clock was finished. The gear trains from the two previous clocks have been revised for improved accuracy, several correction works have been added to make up for irregularities in the celestial orbits, and most importantly, the precession of the equinoxes has been taken into account.

The base of the clock contains a tape recorder, with recordings of Rasmus Sørnes' voice describing the features of the clock. The clock's astronomical part may be driven forwards and backwards at a speed of eight days per minute. The large dial in the middle of the front has a fixed Zodiac and two hands showing the position of the Sun and the Moon on the ecliptic circle. The Sun hand makes one revolution every year, and the Moon hand one revolution every 29.5 day. This dial also shows when and where solar and lunar eclipses occur. The orbit of the Moon has an inclination of 5° with regard to the ecliptic, so solar or lunar eclipses can only occur when the Sun and the Moon are simultaneously located at one of the crossings of the two orbits. These two crossings rotate once in 18.5 years (known as the Saros cycle) and are indicated by the hand with the Ω (omega) sign. Eclipses occur when the three hands overlap, which typically happens two or three times a year; they overlap in nearly exactly the same position every 18.5 years. In the centre of the dial, a spherical slice of the Earth is located. It rotates counter-clockwise once in a sidereal day, and is used to indicate where the eclipse is visible.

At the bottom of the clock, two globes are located. The terrestrial globe rotates once per day, and the arc shows the division between day and night. The celestial globe shows the stars as they would appear if projected on a sphere surrounding the Earth. It rotates once in a sidereal day, but it also rotates around a second axis once in 25,800 years because of the precession of the equinoxes. To achieve this, a gear train with a ratio of 1:9,500,000 is required. This globe is illuminated from inside, and holes are drilled for the larger stars.

This clock is on display at Borgarsyssel Museum, Sarpsborg, Norway. However, during 2013 it was stored away while the building was being renovated.

=== The "Clock No. 4" ===
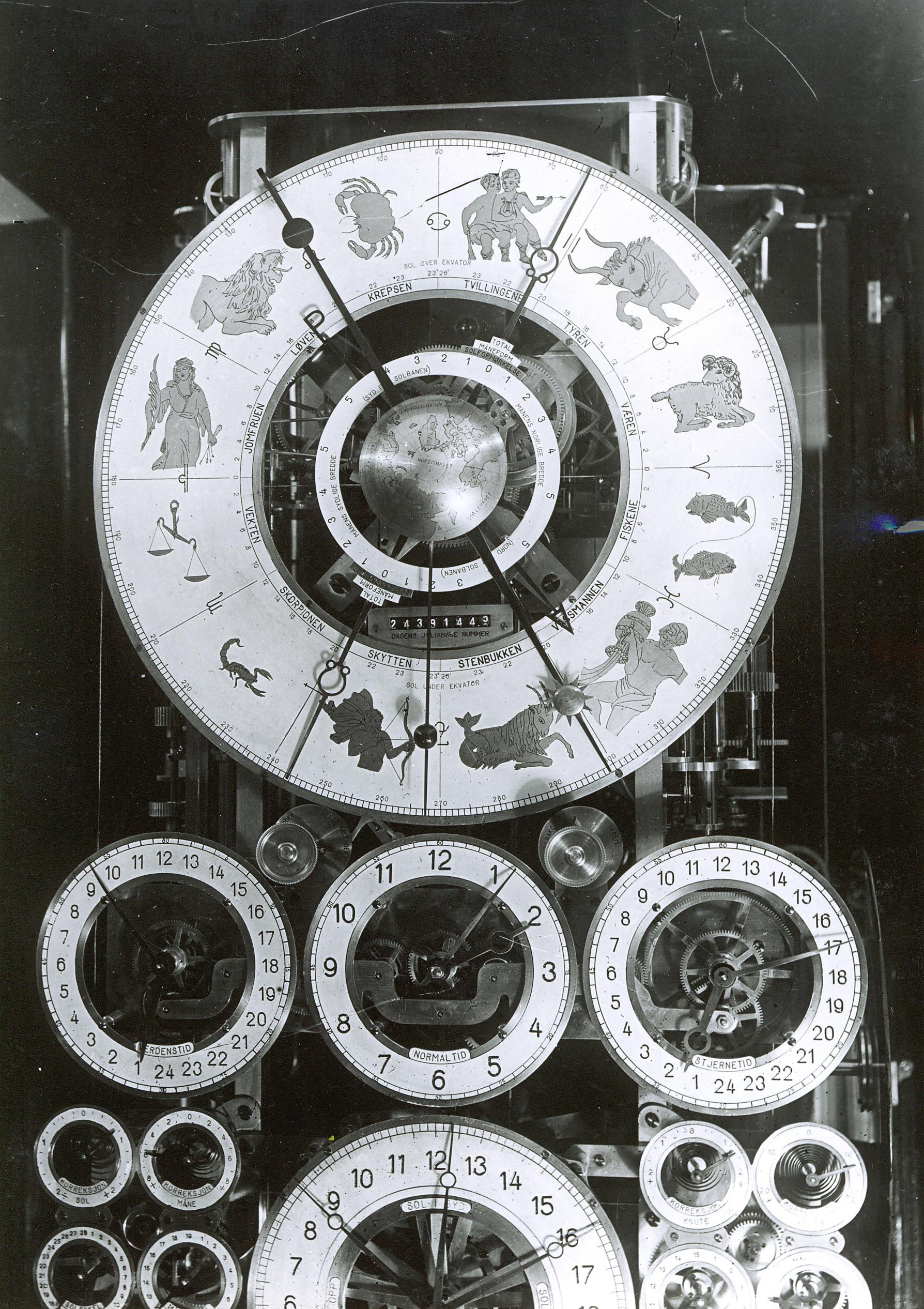
Sørnes' Clock No. 4

The principal design of gear trains and transmissions is similar to Sørnes' fourth and final clock, arguably the most complicated of its kind. Completed in 1967, clock No. 4 was made in Sørnes' spare time, with his own funding, and using his own self-made tools. The clock was exhibited at the Time Museum in Rockford, Illinois beginning in 1967. In 1999, it was transferred to Chicago Museum of Science and Industry for display, until it was sold to an anonymous bidder at auction in 2002. Its location is currently unknown.

The clock No. 4, also called "the Sørnes Clock" (Norwegian: Sørnesuret) is a fusion of art, craftsmanship, and electromechanical technology, engraved and with gold and silver plating. Every part of the clock was handmade in Sørnes' workshop with the sole exception of the pendulum itself; Sørnes also devised and hand-crafted the tools required to make the clock.

Its astounding features include: locations of the Sun and Moon in the zodiac, Julian calendar, Gregorian calendar, sidereal time, Greenwich mean time, local time with daylight saving time and leap year, solar and lunar cycle corrections, eclipses, local sunset and sunrise, moon phases, high and low tides, sunspot cycles and a complete planetarium including Pluto's 248 year orbit and the 25,800 year period of the polar ecliptics (precession of the Earth's axis). It has a high degree of accuracy, having an error of only 7 seconds per 1000 years.

Features of Clock No. 4

- Standard time
- Greenwich Mean Time
- Sidereal time
- Gregorian Calendar
- Metonic cycle
- Solar cycle
- The Indiction
- Julian calendar
- Sunrise and sunset time
- Time when the Sun is in the south
- High tide and low tide
- Moon phases
- Terrestrial globe
- Celestial globe
- Sun spot period
- Solar and lunar eclipse indication
- Complete planetarium with precise orbits (Orrery)
- 25 800 year precession of the equinoxes
- 25,800 year period of the polar ecliptics

== Personal life ==
Rasmus Sørnes married his longtime fiancée Gunhild Serina Kvaeven in 1922, and they had six children. One of his sons is Tor Sørnes, inventor of the keycard lock. He is the grandfather of author Torgrim Sørnes. Sørnes died in 1967, in Jeløy.

== See also ==
- Clock of the Long Now
- Jens Olsen's World Clock
