= Tor Sørnes =

Norwegian engineer and politician (1925–2017)

Tor Sørnes (11 November 1925 – 21 June 2017) was a Norwegian author, politician, engineer and the designer and inventor of the VingCard, the first recodable keycard lock and the magnetic stripe keycard lock.

== Biography ==
Tor Sørnes was born in Sola, Rogaland county, Norway as a son of inventor, radio technician and clockmaker Rasmus Sørnes. In 1950 he was employed as a production planner at steel and ironware factory Christiania Staal & Jernvarefabrikk in Moss, Norway. The factory made locks and ice skates under the brand Ving. In 1955 he became the factory's machine constructor and when the factory, in 1960, established a department of research and development, he was its director.

After singer Connie Francis was attacked in her hotel room in 1974, he launched the holecard-based recodable keycard lock, where each new hotel guest could have their own unique key formed by a pattern of 32 holes in a plastic card. The invention is still in worldwide hotel security use under the brand VingCard. The 32 holes in the key gave 4.2 billion combinations. This lock system was patented in 29 countries. In 1975, Sørnes launched the first recodable cardkey lock, the VingCard, which used a holecard plastic key. He then led the development of and patented the electronic keycard lock, based on the magnetic stripe key.

Export of the system was initiated in 1978 when it was installed in Peachtree Plaza Hotel in Atlanta, Georgia, at the time the world's tallest hotel. The hotel had been troubled by burglaries and was eager to test new security innovations.

In 1992–93 the electronic magnetic stripe card lock was launched and became a worldwide success. Sørnes continued as a vice president and director of R&D at VingCard until retirement in 1992. Following the merger in November 1994 between VingCard's former owners, Abloy Security, and the Swedish Securitas AB, VingCard is now part of Assa Abloy, a Swedish lock manufacturer.

Sørnes was a member of the Moss city council, and lived in Jeløy. His son is the author Torgrim Sørnes.

== Selected works ==
- 2003 – Klokkemakeren Rasmus Sørnes (Borgarsyssel Museum, Sarpsborg Norway) ISBN 82-996847-0-6
