= Vingcard =

Manufacturer of hotel security systems

- Type: Brand division of ASSA ABLOY
- Industry: Property technology, access control
- Founded: 1979; 47 years ago (as VingCard A.S.); 1979; 47 years ago (as Elsafe)
- Headquarters: Moss, Norway
- Area served: Worldwide
- Products: Electronic locks, mobile access platforms, in-room safes, network infrastructure
- Parent: ASSA ABLOY Global Solutions
- Website: www.vingcard.com

Vingcard is a brand within ASSA ABLOY Global Solutions that serves hospitality, build-to-rent and student accommodation markets.

VingCard was founded in Moss, Norway, in 1979 and it was known for developing keycard locking systems for the hotel industry. As the company evolved, its name changed to reflect the broader business strategies.

Initially specializing in hotel access control, it expanded into other areas of property technology. In 2024, ASSA ABLOY reintroduced the name Vingcard as the primary brand for its hospitality technology business.

== History ==
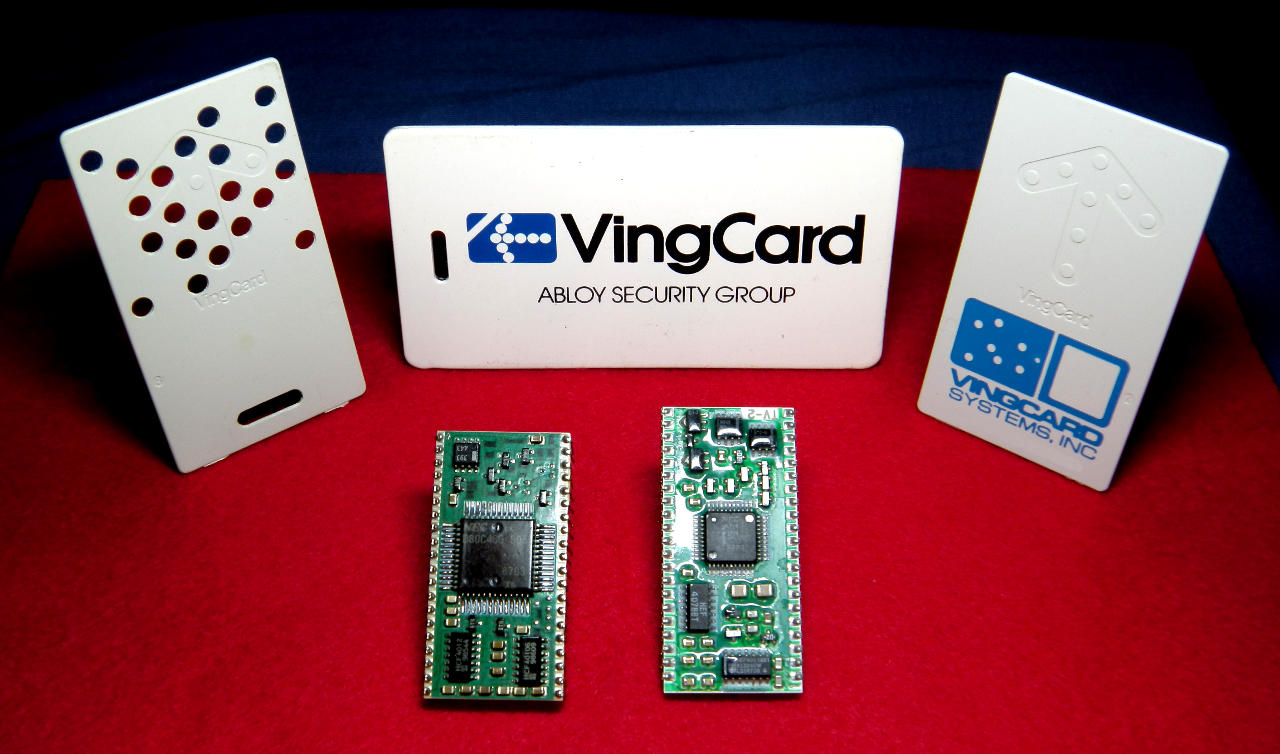
Vingcard Systems 1080 and 1090 electronic optical keycard modules

In 1974, the Norwegian engineer Tor Sørnes, who worked at a factory which made locks and ice skates under the brand name Ving, began to work on a keycard-operated locking system designed for hotel guest rooms after seeing reports of a recent attack.

The project led to the development of the world’s first recodable card lock in 1977. The first installation of the lock was in 1978, at the Peachtree Plaza Hotel in Atlanta, Georgia. The launch of the technology led to the establishment of VingCard A.S. in Moss, Norway. During the same year, Elsafe was founded as a manufacturer of electronic in-room safes. Both companies expanded internationally throughout the 1980s and into the early 1990s.

ASSA ABLOY acquired VingCard and Elsafe in 1994, then both companies were later merged as VingCard Elsafe in 2006. The organization was rebranded first as ASSA ABLOY Hospitality and later as ASSA ABLOY Global Solutions.

VingCard Elsafe discontinued operating as a standalone company in 2015 due to structural changes at ASSA ABLOY. Vingcard and Elsafe continued to be used as product brand names under ASSA ABLOY Global Solutions. In 2024, ASSA ABLOY reintroduced the Vingcard as the brand name for the hospitality market. This later expanded to include the build-to-rent and student accommodation markets.

== Solutions and technologies ==
Vingcard provides services and solutions tailored to hospitality and residential environments, including build-to-rent and student housing including:

- Access Control
- Networks & Digital Access
- Energy & Automation
- Property Operations
- Digital Experience
- Equipment & Accessories

These categories include access management, mobile credentials, such as mobile access and Wallet keys, network infrastructure and building automation technologies that can be integrated with property management systems and operational platforms.

== Expansion through acquisitions ==
Vingcard offerings includes technologies through ASSA ABLOY acquisitions, such as:

- Elsafe (1994) – electronic in-room safes
- TimeLox (2002) – hotel locking systems
- Nomadix and GlobalReach (2024) – network infrastructure and access technologies
- Axxess Industries (2024) – Internet of Things (IoT)-based hardware
- Messerschmitt Systems (2024) – room control technologies
- GESI Hospitality (2026) – regional service and support capabilities

Additional acquisitions, including ENKOA and Char, contributed to the expansion of automation and property operations technologies within the broader offering.

== See Also ==
- Tor Sørnes – Inventor of the original VingCard keycard lock.
- Keycard lock – The type of door locking mechanism pioneered by Vingcard.
- Smart lock – Modern electronic locks often incorporating digital connectivity.
