= Refsnes Gods =

Hotel in Moss, Norway

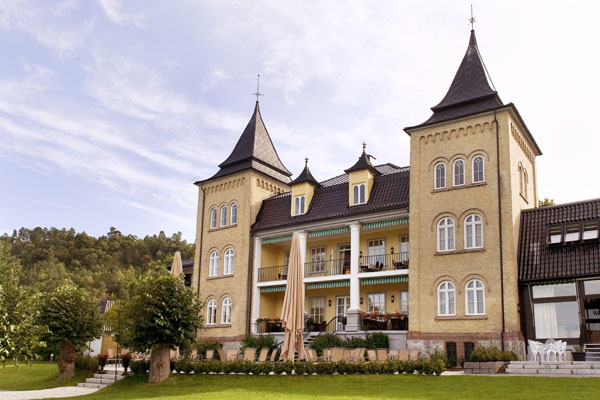

- Location within Norway

General information
- Location: Moss, Norway, Norway
- Coordinates: 59°26′37″N 10°37′00″E
- Completed: 1767

Refsnes Gods is a hotel near the town of Moss, Norway, on the island of Jeløy. According to Frommer's 2005 travel guide, it is "the most elegant resort in the environs of Oslo". The building was originally constructed in 1767 as a pleasure pavilion. It contains a notable art collection.

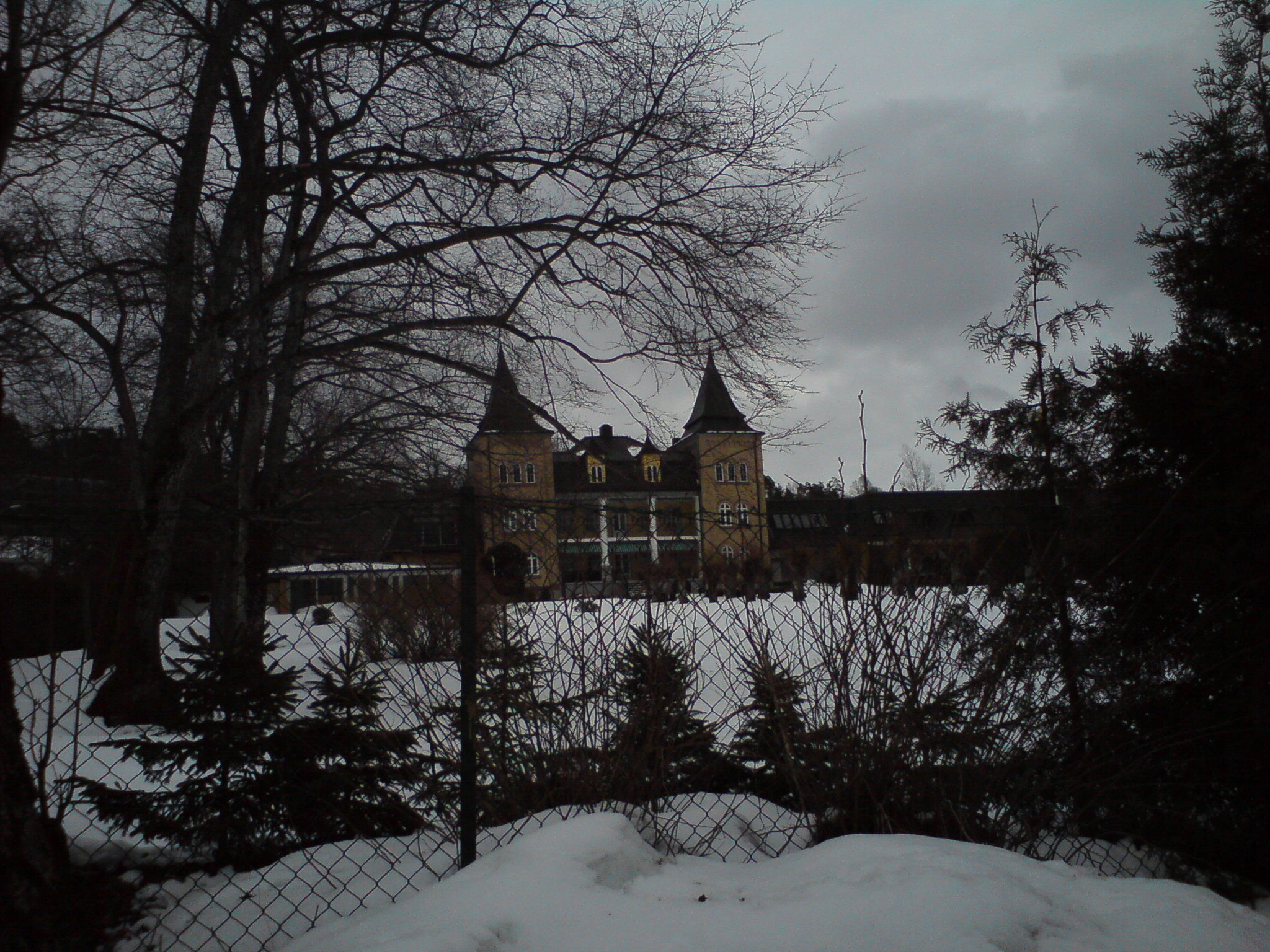
The hotel during winter

"Refsnes" stems from the Norwegian word "rif" (English: reef) due to a reef in the Oslofjord just outside the mansion. "Gods" means mansion in Norwegian.

Since Gunn and Widar Salbuvik assumed ownership in 1998, many unique pieces of art have been displayed at Refsnes Gods. Every guest room and all the common areas have works of a dedicated artist displayed. More than 400 pieces from 90 well-known artists are represented, including Andy Warhol, Edvard Munch, Therese Nordtvedt, Carl Nesjar, Kjell Nupen, Håkon Bleken, Frans Widerberg, and Jacob Weidemann. Three works by Munch were stolen from the hotel in March 2005; they were shortly recovered, although one of the works was damaged during the robbery. The resort is also known for its wine cellar.
