= Jeløya =

Island in Moss, Norway

Coordinates: 59°27′N 10°38′E

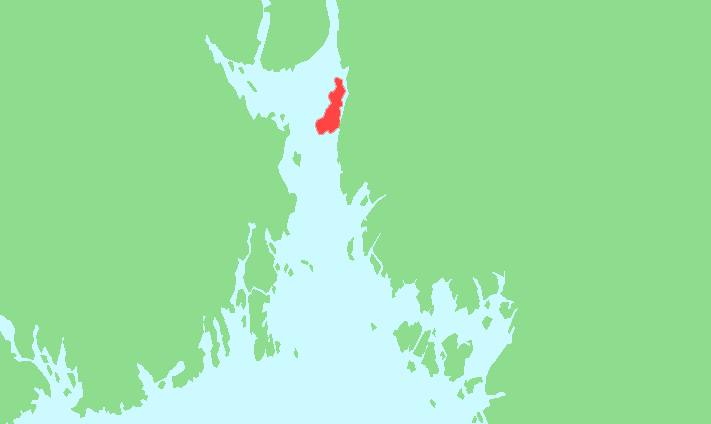
Jeløya in Oslofjord

Jeløya is an island located in the municipality of Moss in Østfold County, Norway.

== History ==
Jeløya was actually a peninsula in the Oslofjord, but was divided from the mainland in 1855 by the Moss canal (Mossekanalen) a 20-meter broad canal that was built through the low isthmus. The Canal Bridge (Kanalbrua) is the link between Jeløya and the mainland at Moss. This was at first a low, sliding bridge, and since 1957 a simple-leaf Bascule bridge, but dating from the early 1990s has been locked and unable to open. Part of the city of Moss lies on the south-eastern part of Jeløya.

At 19 km^{2}, Jeløya is the largest island in the Oslofjord. Geologically, Jeløya is largely made up of a young lava rock-type from the Permian period. Other islands in the Oslofjord formed during that same time period include Revlingen, Eldøya, Missingene and the Søsterøyene. Ringerike sandstone is found in some parts of Jeløya, and fossil cephalaspids have been found. The largest Norwegian moraine from the Ice Age crosses Jeløya, goes to the east of Moss and Rygge and continues through Sweden to Finland.

Until the 1990s, two of Moss' largest industrial zones were on the southern part of Jeløya - Moss Glassverk and Moss Verft. Moss Glassverk produced glass containers from 1898 until 1999. Moss Verft was a shipyard formed in 1870 which was active in shipbuilding until 1987 and was historically one of the biggest employers in the municipality. These areas are now turning into costly apartments and post-industrial businesses. Jeløya is today best known for its beaches, its scenery, a swarming harbor with boats, and Refsnes Gods, a hotel with a renowned cuisine.

Jeløya is the site of a number of country manor houses on farms including Grønli gård and Kubberød gård. Torderød gård is now owned by Moss Municipality which hosts tours during the summer. Grimsrød gård housed Edvard Munch for a number of years. Roed gård has been established as a combined Arts and Cultural Center. Alby gård is the site of one of Norway's most widely known art galleries, Galleri F 15.

== Gallery ==
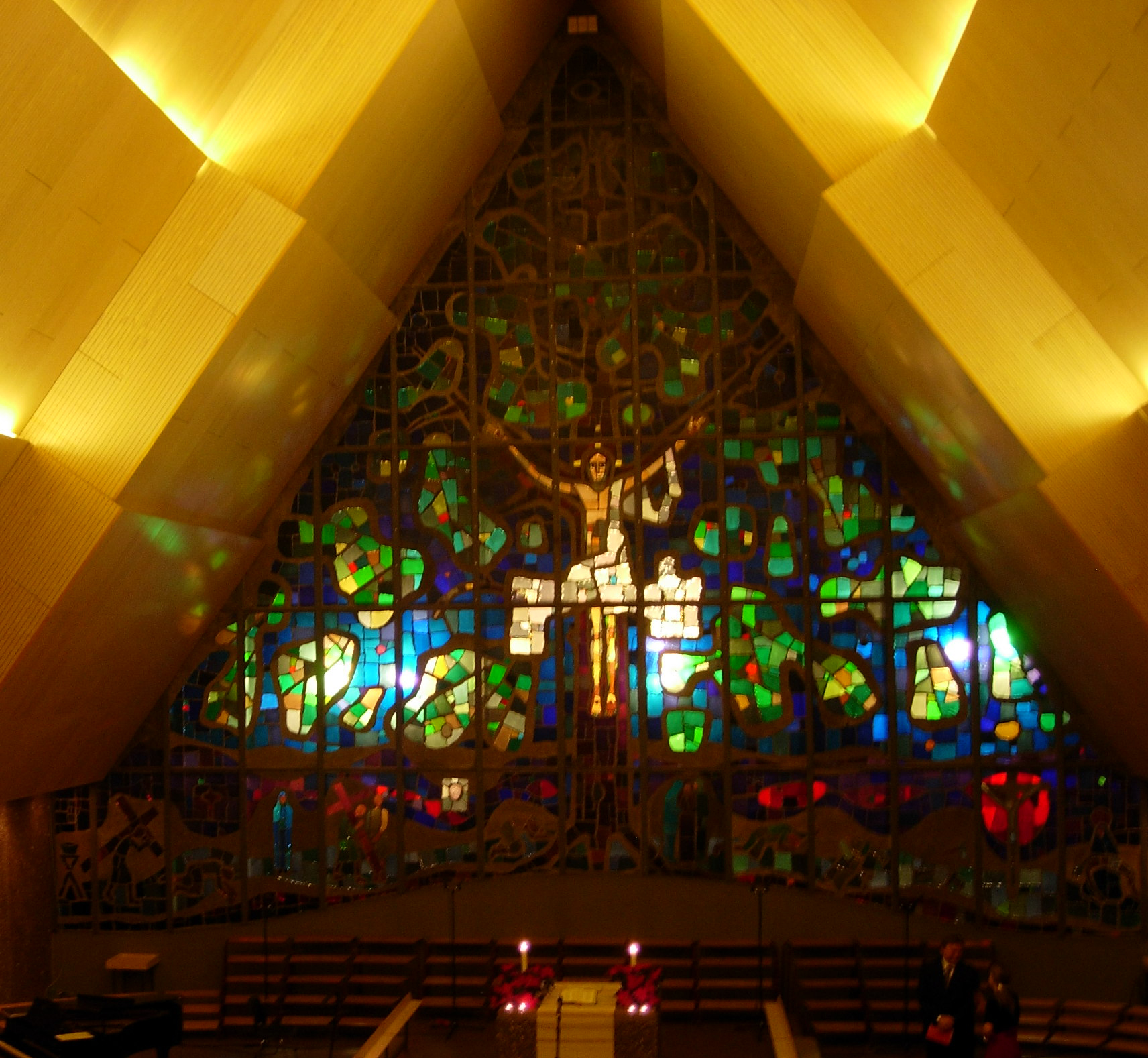
Jeløy Church

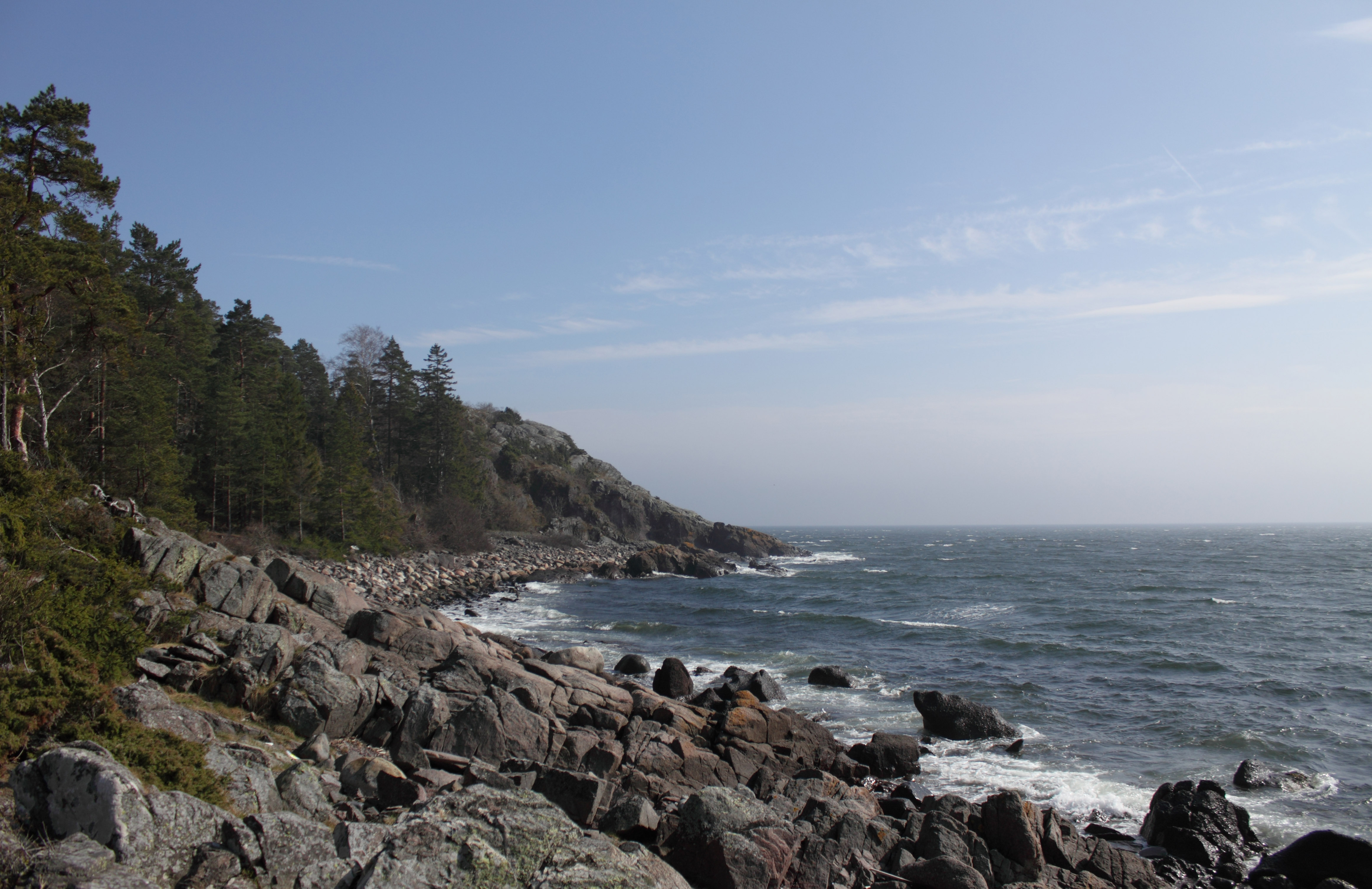
Jeløya Natural Reserve

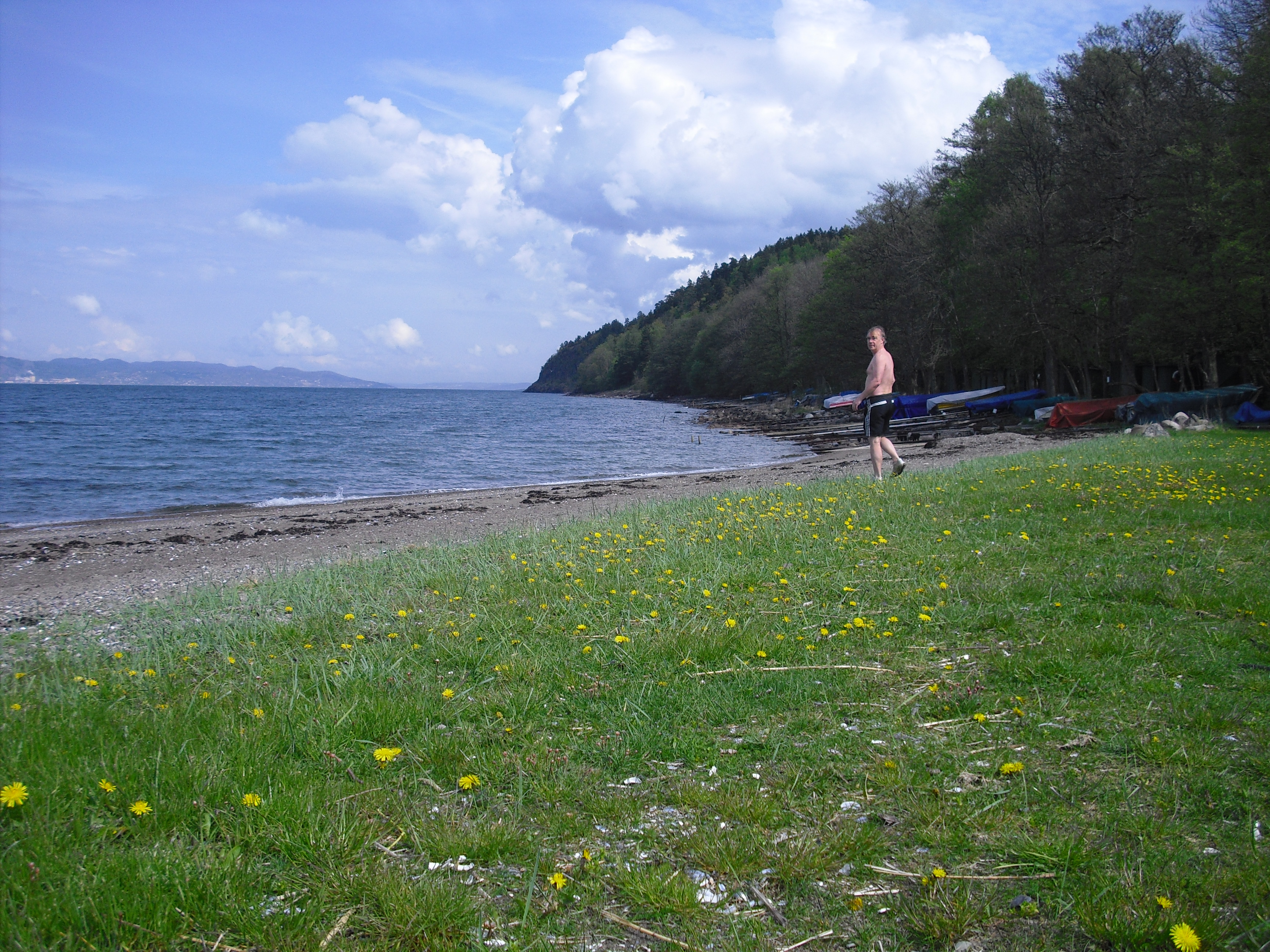
Refsnes beach

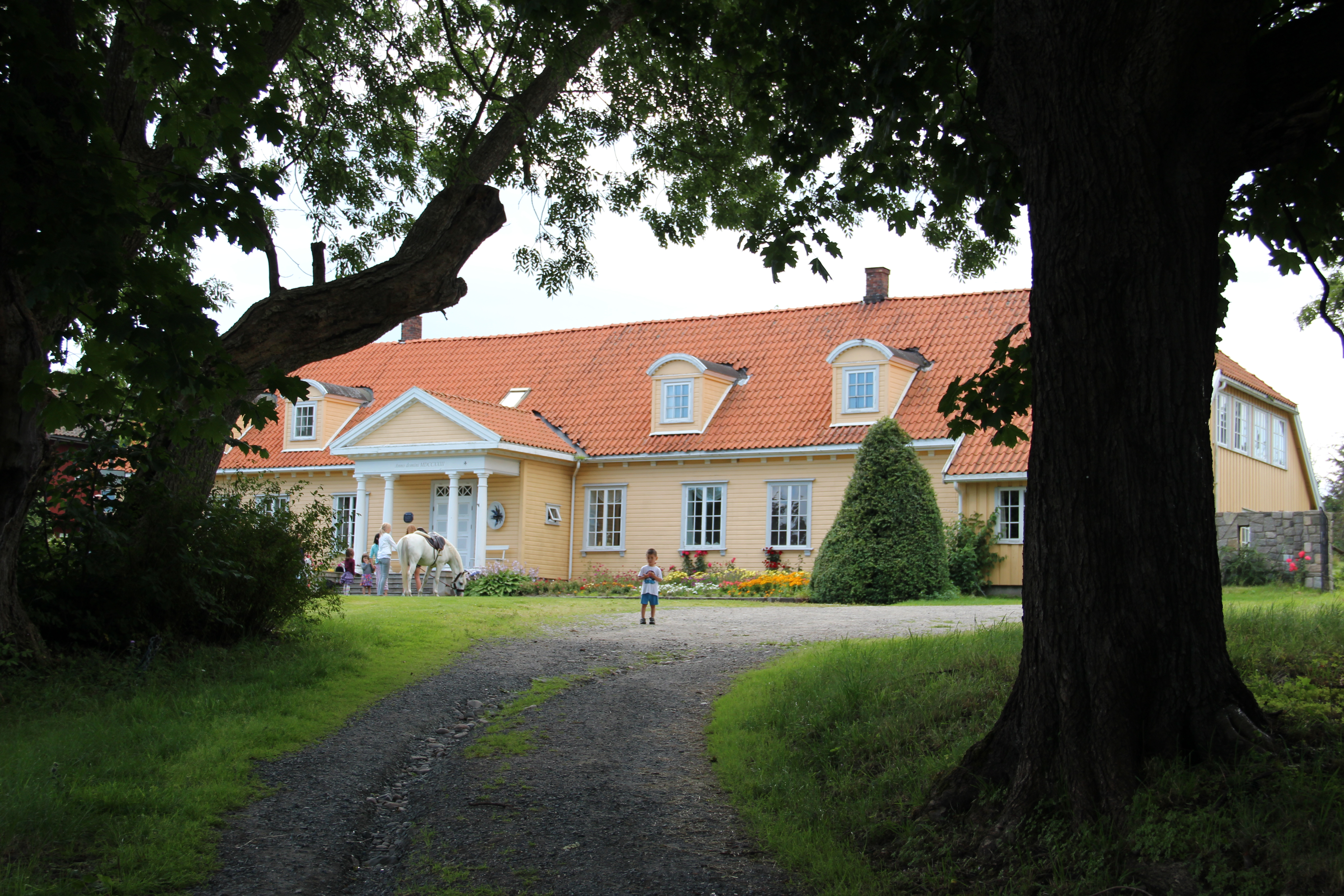
Røed gård

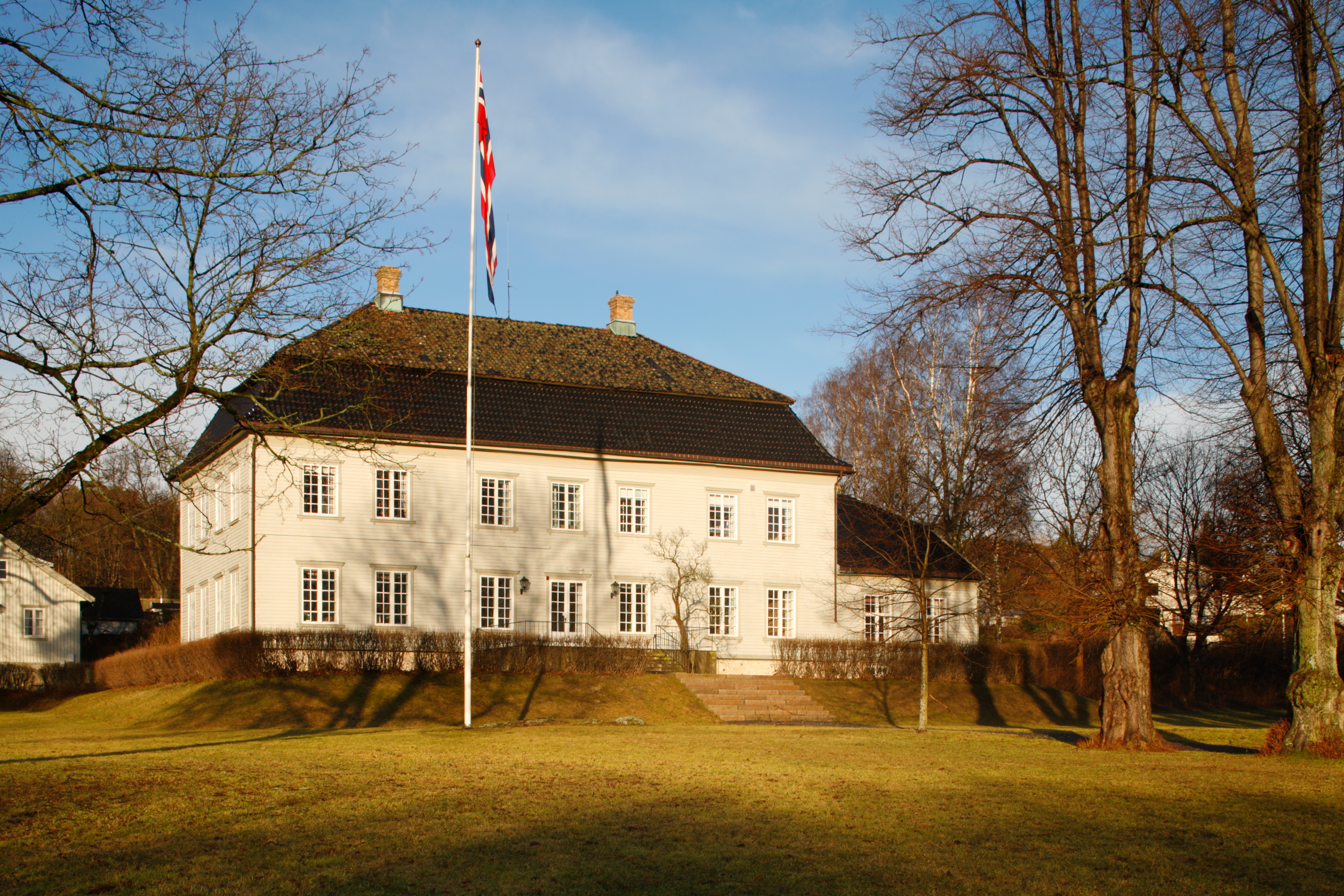
Torderød gård

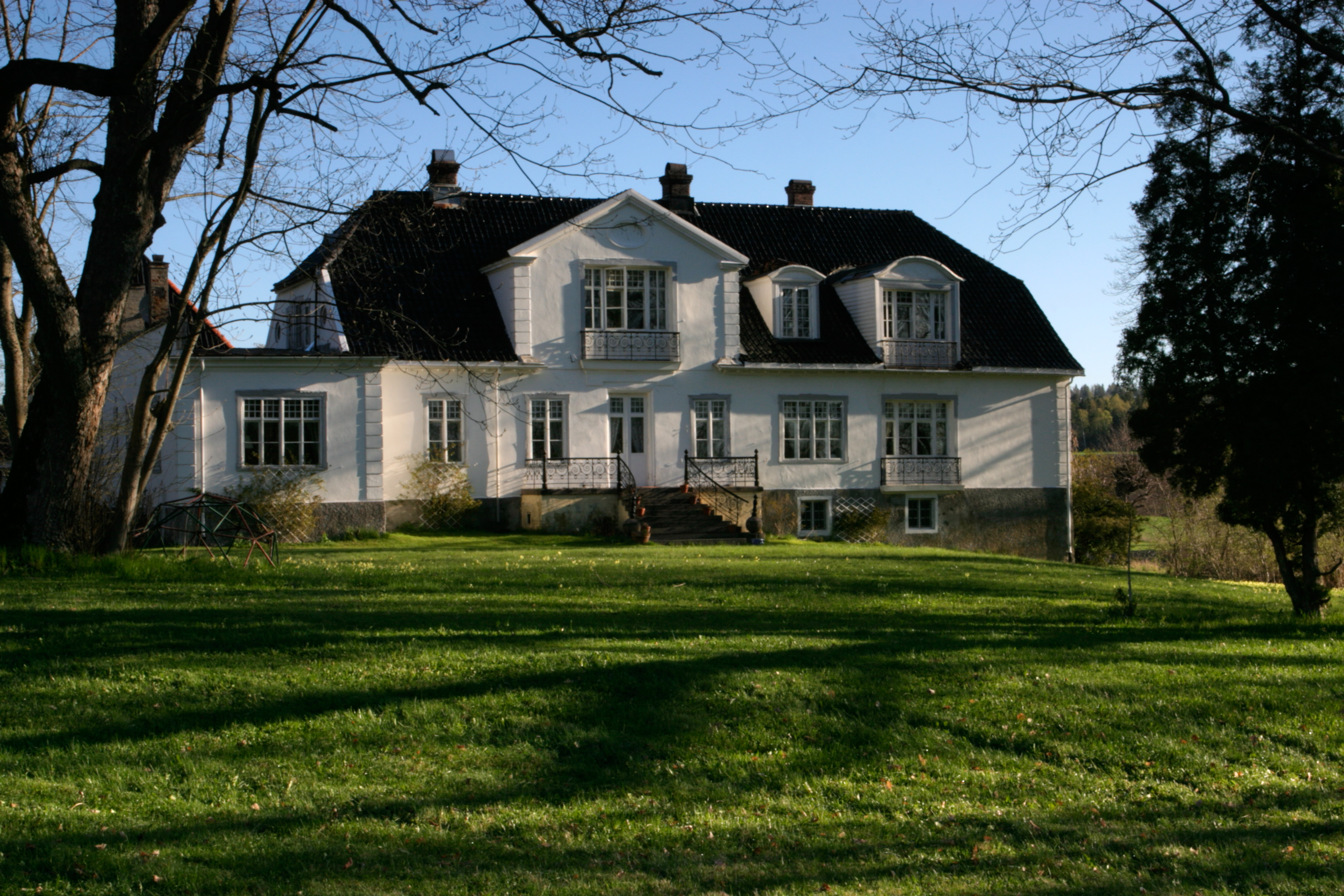
Grønli gård

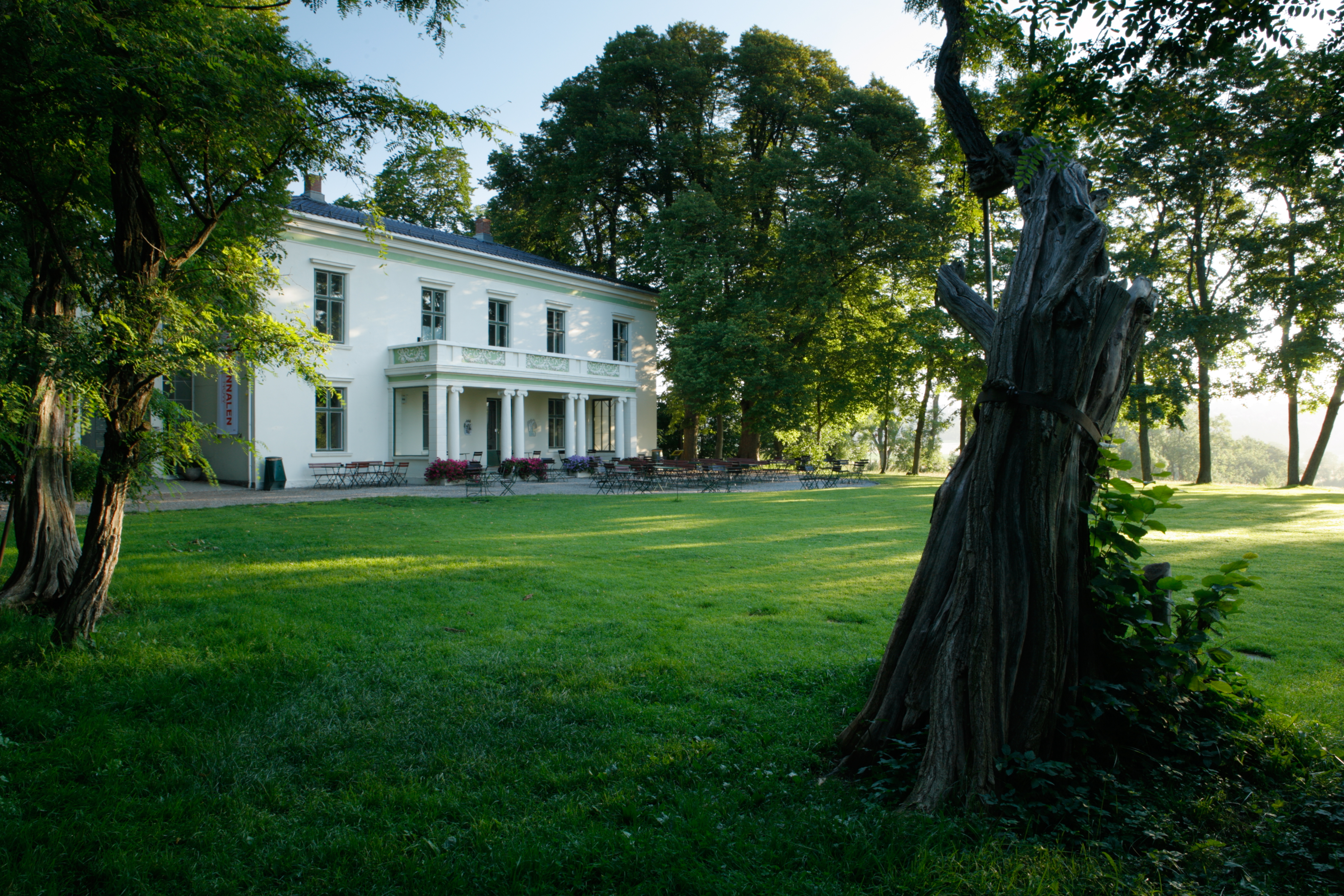
Alby gård

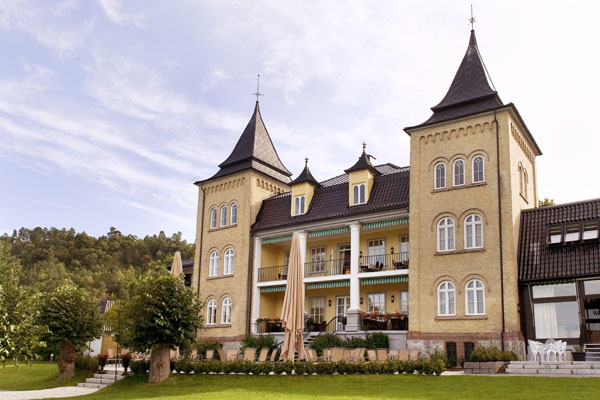
Refsnes Gods
