= Torgrim Sørnes =

Norwegian physician, historian and author (born 1956)

- Born: March 2, 1956 (age 70); Moss, Norway
- Occupations: Author, physician, surgeon
- Spouse: Trine Haugsand
- Children: Tore Sørnes, Ole Sørnes, Jon Sørnes
- Writing career
- Genre: Forensic history
- Website: www.ondskap.org

Torgrim Sørnes (born March 2, 1956, in Moss) is a Norwegian physician, historian and author, who has written extensively on Norwegian social and forensic history.

== Early life and education ==
Sørnes was born in Moss, Østfold, and raised on the island of Jeløy in the Oslofjord. His father is the writer and engineer Tor Sørnes and he has three siblings. He attended Kirkeparken senior high school and later studied medicine at the University of Bergen, subsequently becoming an obstetrician/gynecologist. He currently resides in Lørenskog, outside of Oslo.

== Career ==
He made his publishing debut in 2009 with the book Cruelty: The executed in Norway 1815–1876 (Norwegian: Ondskap: De henrettede i Norge 1815–1876), which deals in detail with every case of capital punishment in the period 1815–1876, fellow crime author and historian Hans Olav Lahlum called it "a masterpiece". Aftenposten called it a "unique insight into the old norwegian society seen from below".

His second work, No Mercy: The executed in Norway 1783–1814 (2011), which can be regarded as a prequel to his first book, takes an in-depth look on Norwegian judicial history in general and cases of capital punishment in the period 1783–1814 in particular, again dealing with every case individually and in relation to the society at the time. He puts some perspective on the influence of demography and social inequalities in dealing with both perpetrators and victims. He has been noted for bringing the view of a clinician when regarding the anatomical methodology and the art and technique of the classical executions.

=== Anna Østmo mystery ===
In October 2010, Sørnes was called in to investigate when startled construction workers in Åsnes uncovered centuries-old human remains at their building site. Sørnes quickly determined it to be the remains of an 18th-century female, condemned child-murderer Anna Østmo, who was executed for murdering her two infant children in 1784. Trial records indicated that her dying wish was to be interred at the church cemetery; however, this would not be granted until April 2012, 228 years later, at the request of Sørnes.

A similar incident occurred in October 2011 in Stavern when workers uncovered another set of mysterious skeletal human remains, which again turned out to be centuries old. This time Sørnes deduced that it either belonged to a murderer executed in 1816, or one executed in 1775. Its precise identity was never confirmed.

== Bibliography ==
- 2009: Cruelty: The executed in Norway 1815–1876 (Norwegian: Ondskap: De henrettede i Norge 1815–1876) ISBN 978-82-516-2720-7
- 2011: No Mercy: The executed in Norway 1783–1814 (Norwegian: Uten Nåde: De henrettede i Norge 1783–1814) ISBN 978-82-516-5559-0
- 2014: Deeds of the dark: The executed in Norway 1772–1782 (Norwegian: Mørkets Gjerninger: De henrettede i Norge 1772–1782) ISBN 978-82-823-3255-2
- 2016: Executioner: Mathias Fliegenring 1685–1729 (Norwegian: Bøddel: Mathias Fliegenring 1685–1729) ISBN 978-82-516-8604-4
- 2018: In human form: The executed in Norway 1765–1771 (Norwegian: Menneskeham: De henrettede i Norge 1765–1771) ISBN 978-82-936-4126-1
- 2020: The valleys of the shadow of death: The executed in Norway 1759–1764 (Norwegian: Dødsskyggens daler: De henrettede i Norge 1759–1764) ISBN 978-82-841-6151-8
- 2021: Dr Gisleson and his patients (Norwegian: Dr Gisleson og hans pasienter) ISBN 978-82-841-6168-6
- 2022: A wilderness of horrors (Norwegian: Et villnis av redsler) ISBN 978-82-841-6172-3
- 2023: Death and agony (Norwegian: Død og pine) ISBN 978-82-841-6390-1
- 2024: Life for life (Norwegian: liv for liv) ISBN 978-82-841-6362-8
- 2026: In the hands of the executioner (Norwegian: Under bøddelens hender) ISBN 978-82-841-63772

=== Reviews ===
- in Haugesunds Avis (in Norwegian)
- in Aftenposten (in Norwegian)
- in Journal of the Norwegian Medical Association (in Norwegian)
- in Vesterålen Online (in Norwegian)
- in Bokavisen (in Norwegian)
- in Bokelskere (in Norwegian)
