= Moss, Norway =

Moss Municipality Moss kommune
- Municipality
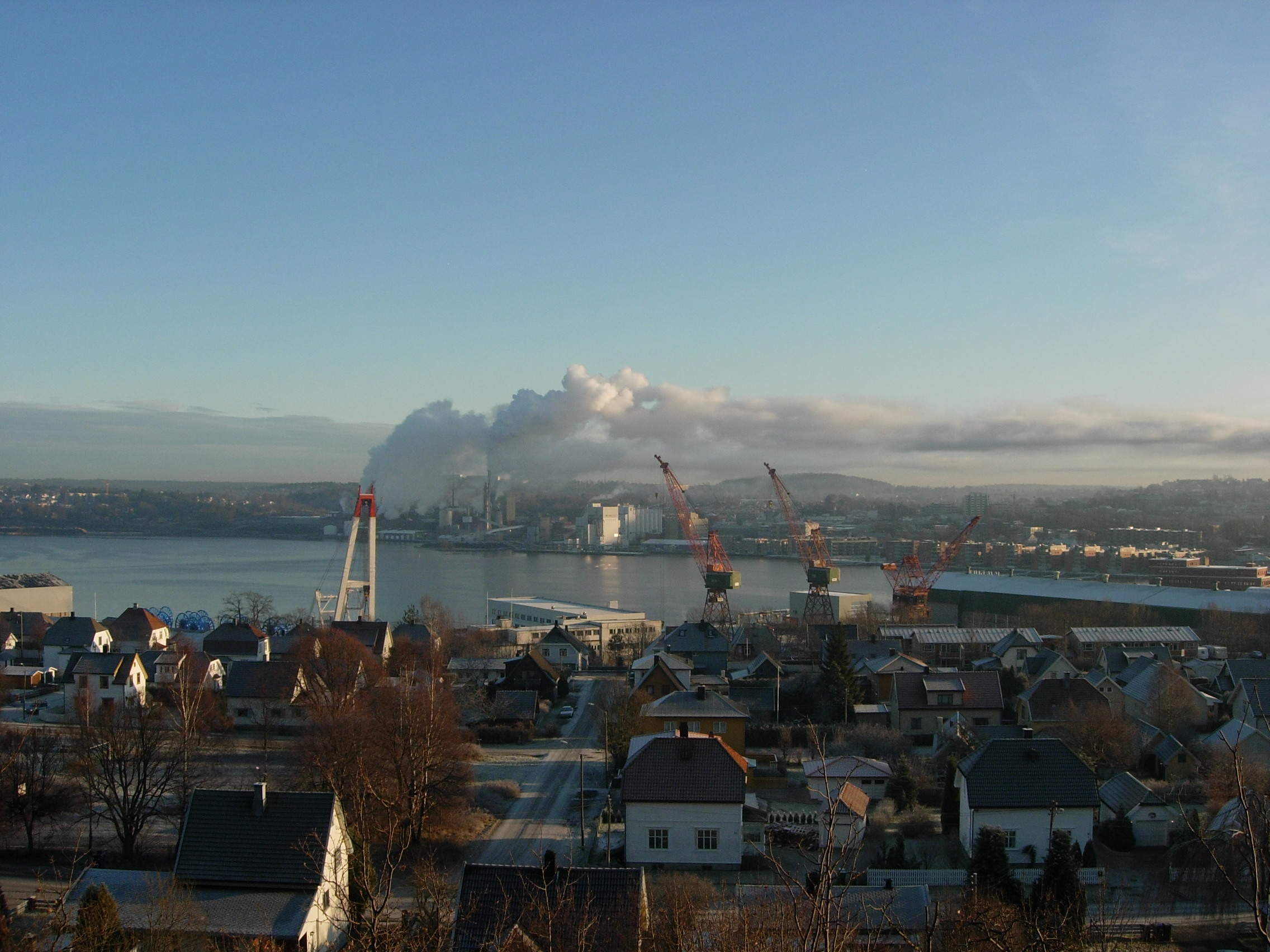
- Moss seen from Jeløya

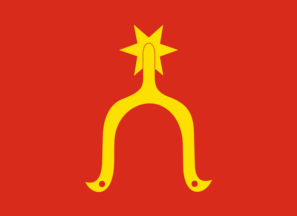
- Flag Coat of arms

- Østfold within Norway

- Moss within Østfold
- Coordinates: 59°27′33″N 10°42′3″E
- Country: Norway
- County: Østfold
- Administrative centre: Moss

Government
  - Mayor (2023): Simen Nord (H)

Area
  - Total: 63 km^{2} (24 sq mi)
  - Land: 58 km^{2} (22 sq mi)
  - Rank: #414 in Norway

Population (2021)
  - Total: 49 668
  - Rank: #27 in Norway
  - Density: 440/km^{2} (1,100/sq mi)
  - Change (10 years): ▲ +10.6%
- Demonym: Mossing

Official language
  - Norwegian form: Neutral
- Time zone: UTC+01:00 (CET)
  - Summer (DST): UTC+02:00 (CEST)
- ISO 3166 code: NO-3103
- Website: Official website

Moss is a coastal town and a municipality in Østfold county, Norway. The administrative centre of the municipality is the town of Moss. The city of Moss was established as a municipality on 1 January 1838 (see formannskapsdistrikt) and City in 1720. The rural municipality of Jeløy was merged with the city on 1 July 1943. The former municipality of Rygge was merged into it on 1 January 2020.

Its administrative district covers areas east of the town, such as the island of Dillingøy in the lake Vansjø. Parts of the town are located on the peninsula of Jeløy. The city of Moss has 30,723 inhabitants (2012).

== Name ==
The Old Norse form of the name was Mors. It may be derived from an old root mer- which means to "divide" or "split".

The adjacent topography shares similar etymology:

- Mosse-elva, Mosse-"marsh-river-border"+ elva (see elbe, elver, Old Norse for river). The name is thought to be very old and the meaning of it is not clear.
- Mosse-sundet, Mosse-"marsh-river-border"+ sundet (Moss channel).
- Mosse-herred, Mosse-"marsh-river-border"+ herred -"court" akin to hort(us, en), "garden," from PIE *ghr-ti-, from base *gher- "to grasp, enclose" (see yard) Actually "Moss county".

== History ==
Archeological finds suggest that there were settlements in the area more than 7,000 years ago and continuously through the Iron Age, Viking Age, through to modern times. During the Viking era, the place was known as Varna (from the Old Norse vorn, or protection) and was the site of a cooperative for battleships held by local warlords on behalf of the king.

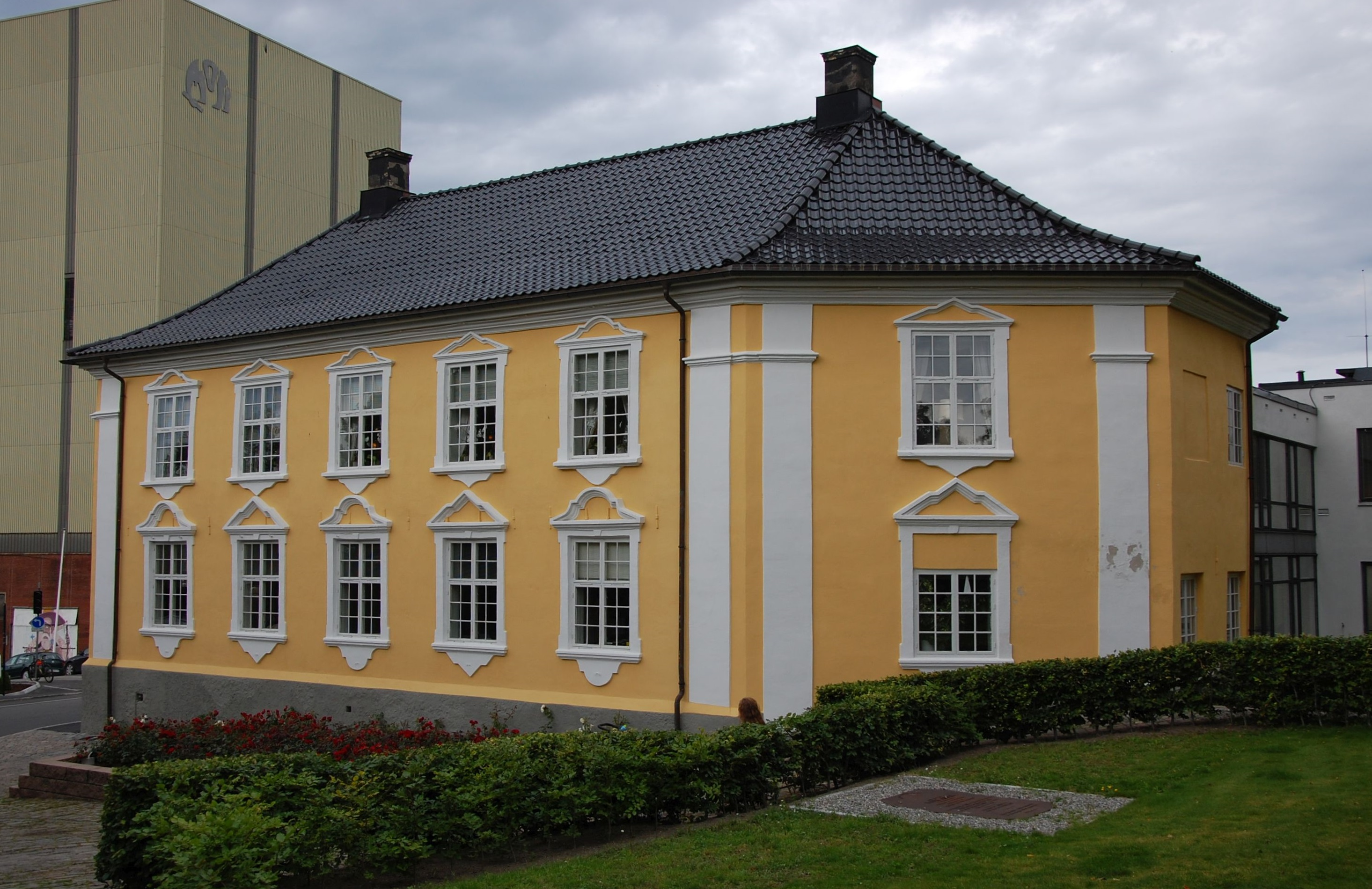
Konvensjonsgården in Moss from 1778, the signing place of the Convention of Moss

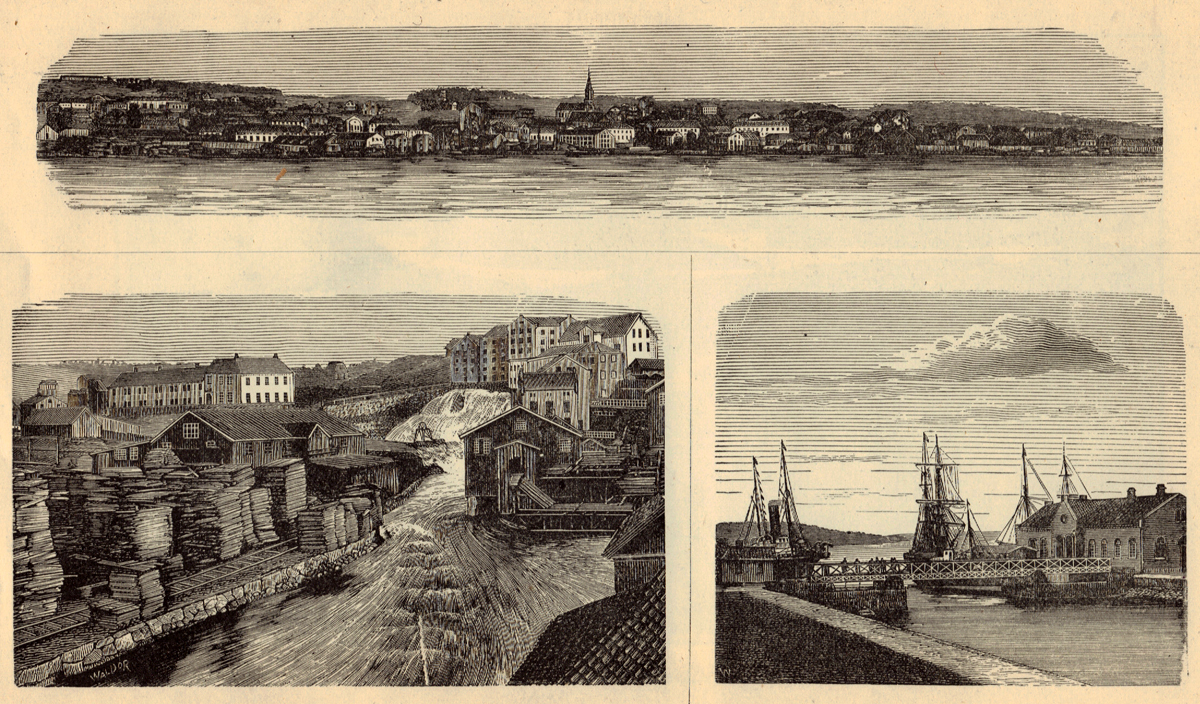
Moss in 1885

The first literary reference to the name Mo(u)ſs(ß) is from Bishop Eystein Aslaksson's Red book (NRA AM fol. 328) from 1396, and by then the town had become a commercial center with craftsmen and mills. By the 16th century, the town's port was significant enough to warrant its own customs official. Liquor distilleries became one of the dominant industries, and it was not until 1607, after the Reformation, that the town got its own church.

By 1700, Moss had become a hub for both ship and land traffic between Copenhagen and Christiania, and in 1704 Moss Jernverk (Moss Ironworks) was established just north of the city center. By 1720 it received its charter as a merchant town, with its own official. This may have had background in an important battle in 1716 that was fought in the town square in Moss in which Norwegian troops commanded by Vincent Budde prevailed over invading Swedish forces, sent by Charles XII to capture Akershus Fortress. In 1767 a local resident built a "pleasure pavilion" near the town, which survives as the Hotel Refsnes Gods.

In 1814, Moss became the site for the signing of the Convention of Moss, which effectively put an end to the Dano-Norwegian kingdom. This set the stage for economic development that has persisted to this day.

On the morning of 14 July 2006, a bolide exploded above the nearby town of Rygge - moments later, several stony meteorites fell over Moss. A number of meteorites were recovered by local residents and visiting meteorite hunters, which after analysis and classification, were found to be a rare type of carbonaceous chondrite.

=== Seal and coat-of-arms ===
Moss became a separate city in 1786 and received its first seal the same year. The seal showed a church under some clouds, placed within a circle. Above the circle were fasces, the late 19th century symbol of freedom. A later seal, dating from around 1829, shows the same composition, but with six birds flying around the church.

In the 1930s the city wanted to adopt a coat-of-arms and the birds were chosen as a possible symbol. The original birds were likely doves, a symbol of peace. In 1934, the idea of the crow was launched. The residents of Moss have long been referred to as crows. An old tale tells of a number of birds, thought to have been crows, swarming around the church spire due to a fire that started when lightning struck a birds' nest in the spire. The fire was quickly put out; birds became a motif in the city seal (and later coat-of-arms) for that reason.

The coat-of-arms was granted on 2 April 1954 and shows a yellow crow on a red background. It was designed by Christian Stenersen.

=== Norwegian lady statues ===
Moss and Virginia Beach, Virginia in the United States are sister cities. On Good Friday, 27 March 1891, the Norwegian bark Dictator, whose home port was Moss, was lost in the treacherous waters of the Graveyard of the Atlantic. The ship had been en route to England from Pensacola, Florida with a cargo of Georgia Pine lumber. After being caught and disabled in a storm, she was headed for port at Hampton Roads, Virginia to make repairs when she encountered another storm just off Virginia Beach.

Working in the high winds and seas, lifesaving crews from shore were able to save some of the 17 persons aboard. However, Captain J. M. Jorgensen's pregnant wife, Johanne, and their 4-year-old son Carl were among the 7 persons who drowned.

The ship's wooden female figurehead had washed ashore. It was placed in a vertical position facing the ocean near the boardwalk as a memorial to those who died in the shipwreck. It was a landmark there for more than 60 years, but gradually became weathered and eroded.

In 1962, Norwegian sculptor Ørnulf Bast was commissioned to create two nine-foot bronze replicas of the original figurehead by the City of Moss. The Norwegian Lady Statues were unveiled on 22 September 1962. One was presented as a gift to Virginia Beach, and an exact duplicate was erected in Moss to unite the two sister cities. Each statue gives the appearance of facing the other across the Atlantic Ocean.

On 13 October 1995, Queen Sonja of Norway visited the Norwegian Lady statue in Virginia Beach, and placed memorial flowers.

== Geography ==
Moss is located on the eastern shore of Oslofjord, 60 km south of Oslo. The municipality also includes some islands, like Jeløya. The Raet goes through the municipality. The area is forested lowland, the highest point is 140 m asl. 84% of the population is located in the town Moss.

=== Neighborhoods ===
In central Moss, a channel divides the mainland from Jeløya in the west. The surrounding area is called Kanalen ("The Channel"). Moss Station is close to the channel, and in the late 2010s, 121 buildings in the neighborhood Nyquistbyen were torn down to develop the station area.

North of the station, Moss Church and the city hall are located. This area is typically called Moss sentrum. To the north is the river Mosseelva with the waterfall Mossefossen. The area around the waterfall is called Møllebyen ("The Mill Town"), containing the town's early industry. North of the river, heavy industry developed including Moss Jernverk and M. Peterson & Søn, resulting in the name Verket ("The Works").

Another neighborhood north of the river and the lake that empties into it (Vansjø) is Krapfoss. South of Krapfoss and across the lake, neighborhoods like Klommesten, Ørehavna and Ørejordet are mainly residential. Ørejordet also has a sports complex, as does Melløs south of here, known for Melløs Stadion.

== Climate ==
Moss has a humid continental climate (Dfb), or a temperate oceanic climate (Cfb) if the original −3 °C (27 °F) threshold in the Köppen climate classification is used. The weather station at Moss Airport Rygge (40 m) started recording temperature in 1955. The all-time high 34.2 °C (93.6 °F) was recorded August 1982, and the all-time low −31.5 °C (−24.7 °F) in February 1985. 10 of the record lows are from before 1990, and only the December record low is from after 2000. Rygge airport is located more inland and will have colder lows in winter and autumn than the town. The average date for first overnight freeze (below 0 °C (32 °F)) in autumn is 7 October (1981-2010 average) at Rygge.

Climate data for Moss Airport, Rygge 1991-2020 (40 m, extremes 1955-2024, sunhrs from Oslo)
Month	Jan	Feb	Mar	Apr	May	Jun	Jul	Aug	Sep	Oct	Nov	Dec	Year
Record high °C (°F)	11.2 (52.2)	13.5 (56.3)	21 (70)	24.9 (76.8)	30 (86)	31.2 (88.2)	33.9 (93.0)	34.2 (93.6)	27 (81)	20 (68)	16.7 (62.1)	13.2 (55.8)	34.2 (93.6)
Mean daily maximum °C (°F)	0.8 (33.4)	1.5 (34.7)	5.1 (41.2)	10.4 (50.7)	15.8 (60.4)	19.3 (66.7)	21.5 (70.7)	20.7 (69.3)	16.3 (61.3)	10.2 (50.4)	5.2 (41.4)	1.9 (35.4)	10.7 (51.3)
Daily mean °C (°F)	−1.7 (28.9)	−1.5 (29.3)	1.3 (34.3)	5.9 (42.6)	11 (52)	14.8 (58.6)	17.2 (63.0)	16.3 (61.3)	12.3 (54.1)	7.2 (45.0)	2.9 (37.2)	−0.6 (30.9)	7.1 (44.8)
Mean daily minimum °C (°F)	−4.5 (23.9)	−4.4 (24.1)	−2.1 (28.2)	1.8 (35.2)	6.4 (43.5)	10.5 (50.9)	13 (55)	12.3 (54.1)	8.7 (47.7)	4.2 (39.6)	0.4 (32.7)	−3.3 (26.1)	3.6 (38.4)
Record low °C (°F)	−27.7 (−17.9)	−31.5 (−24.7)	−28.4 (−19.1)	−11.6 (11.1)	−4.9 (23.2)	−0.3 (31.5)	3.6 (38.5)	0.7 (33.3)	−5.1 (22.8)	−9.7 (14.5)	−19.5 (−3.1)	−26.5 (−15.7)	−31.5 (−24.7)
Average precipitation mm (inches)	67.3 (2.65)	52.6 (2.07)	49.7 (1.96)	50.7 (2.00)	54.6 (2.15)	76.3 (3.00)	76.5 (3.01)	96.8 (3.81)	88.3 (3.48)	110.6 (4.35)	98.3 (3.87)	76.8 (3.02)	898.5 (35.37)
Average precipitation days (≥ 1.0 mm)	11	9	8	8	9	10	12	13	11	12	12	11	126
Mean monthly sunshine hours	45.1	77.6	146.5	182.0	248.0	230.3	244.1	203.8	150.1	94	50.9	40.0	1,712.4
Source 1: eklima.no/met.no (extremes)
Source 2: NOAA

== Industry ==
The town is known for paper mills, as well as metalworks and other factories. Dillingøy is known as a place for alternative non-military civil service. Moss is mentioned since the Renaissance and was the site of the signing of the Convention of Moss in 1814, which solidified the union with Sweden. The headquarters of textile producer Helly Hansen were located in Moss until 2009. The maker of international hotel keycards, Trio Ving, also has their headquarters here. AquaFence, a manufacturer of reusable temporary flood and hurricane barriers, is headquartered here.

== Transport ==
The railway Østfold Line runs through Moss, stopping at Moss Station, which is the southern terminus of one service of the Oslo Commuter Rail and an intermediate stop for regional trains. Moss connects across the Oslofjord to Horten via the Moss–Horten Ferry. There are also bus-lines to Oslo Airport, Gardermoen, Gothenburg, Copenhagen, Oslo in addition to local bus lines. Moss port is one of the top 3 busiest container ports in Norway (measured in TEUs).

== Health care ==
Together with Østfold Kalnes Hospital, Østfold Moss Hospital covers general health care services for the municipality. The hospital is a modern unit for planned operations. There is a large outpatient and inpatient activity in a number of disciplines, in the field of somatics and mental health care as well as an operation department for both inpatient and day surgery. There is an eye department, imaging services, blood sampling and blood bank and more. The municipality also has three health stations - City center, Bredsand and Kambo health stations.

== Sport ==
Moss FK are the town's football club. They play in the First Division, and have played in the Norwegian Premier League as recently as 2002.

== Notable people ==
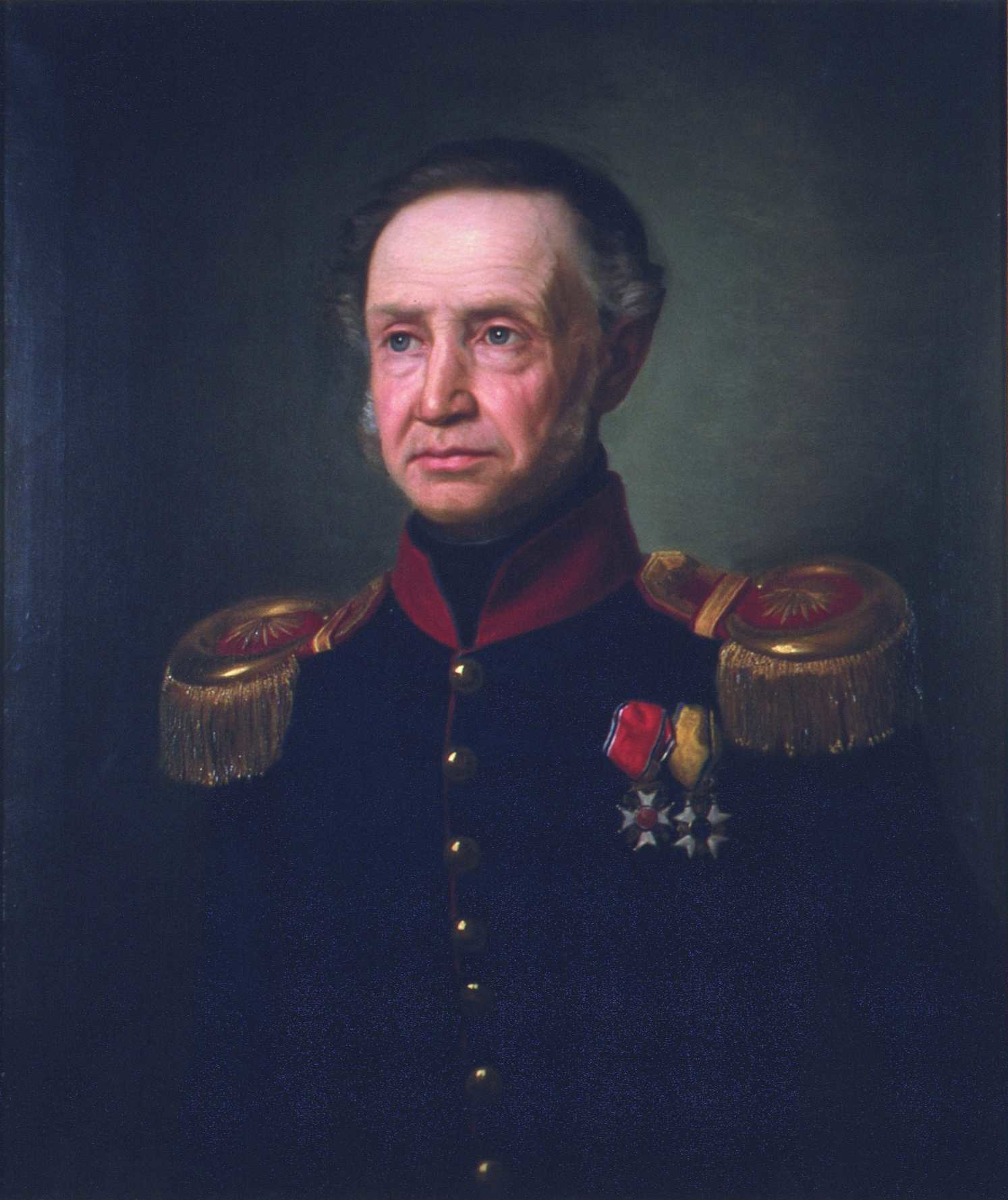
Arild Sibbern, 1855

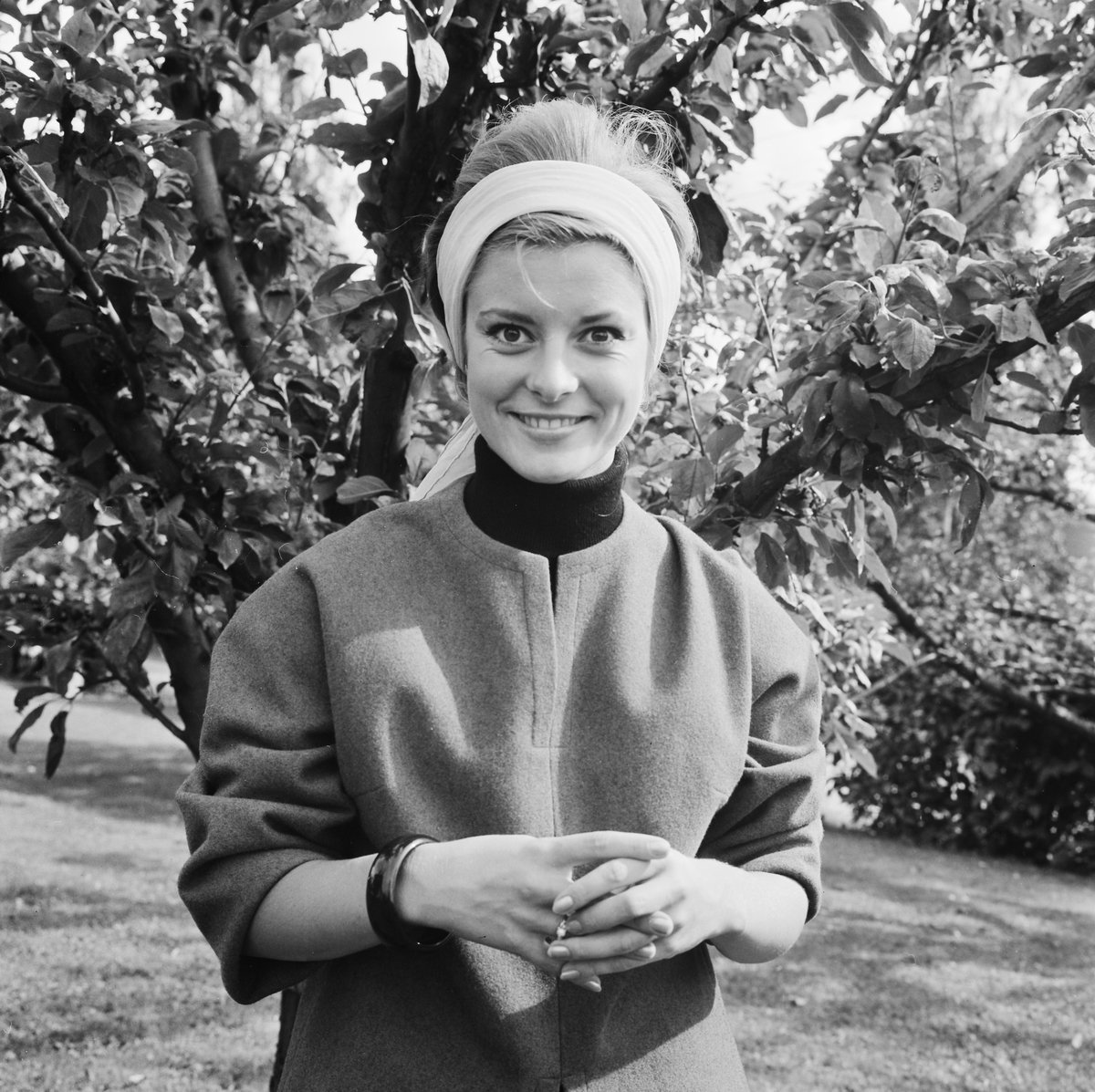
Grynet Molvig, 1964

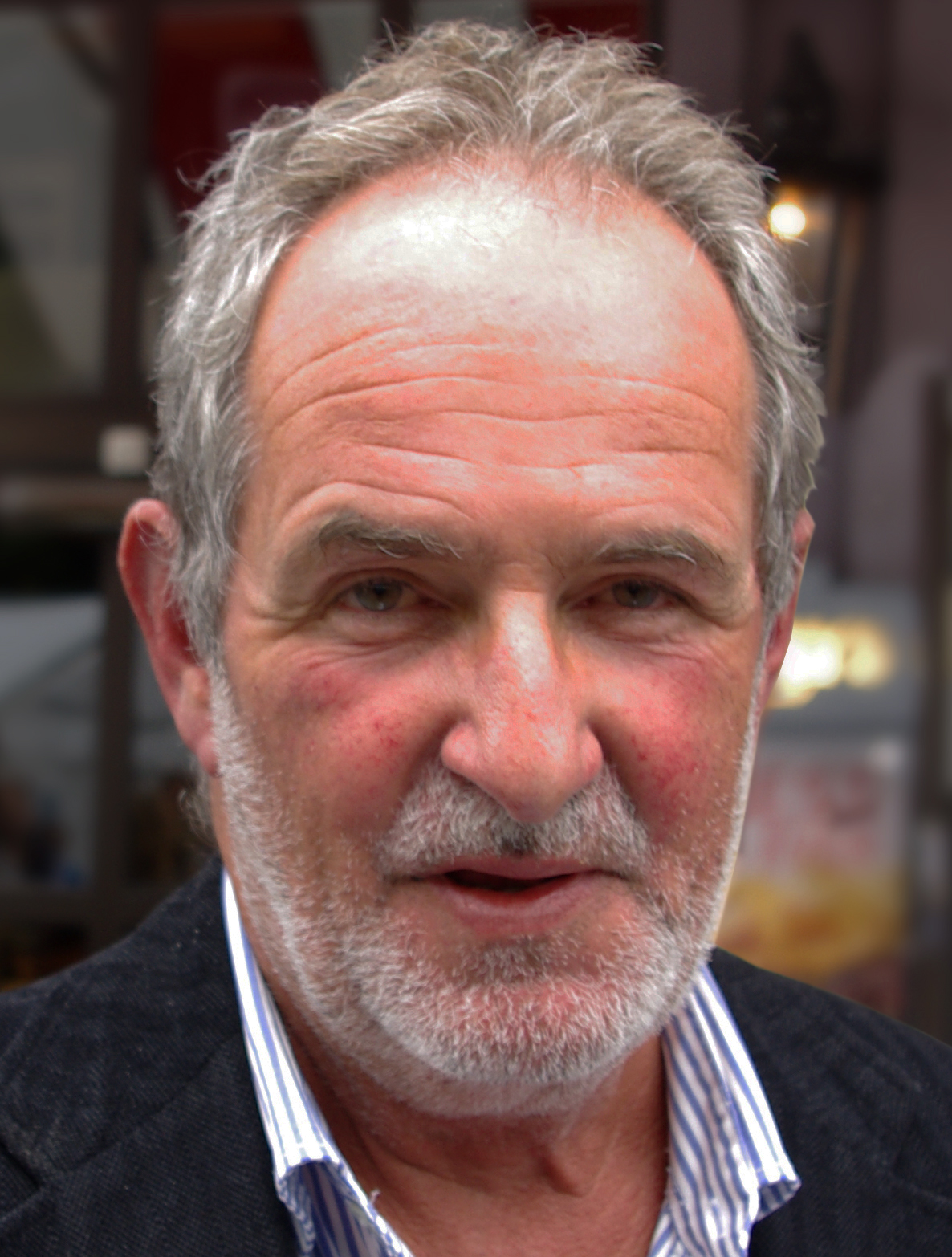
Jon Michelet 2011

people from Moss are known locally as "Mossinger"

- Ari Behn (1972–2019), author and playwright; former husband of Princess Märtha Louise of Norway; brought up in Moss
- Tina Bru (born 1986 in Moss), politician and government minister
- Palle Rømer Fleischer (1781 in Moss – 1851), representative at the Norwegian Constitutional Assembly
- Gregers Gram (1846 in Moss – 1929), Norwegian prime minister in Stockholm, 1889 to 1891
- Christopher Hansteen (1822 in Moss – 1912), judge, associate justice on the Supreme Court of Norway, 1867 to 1905
- Eyvind Hellstrøm (born 1948 in Moss), gourmet chef and TV personality
- Knut Jacobsen (1910–1971), actor and costume designer
- Gretha Kant (born 1945), politician, mayor of Moss, 1995 to 2003
- Jorunn Kristiansen, Miss Norway 1959
- David Menkin (born 1977 in Moss), film, TV and voice actor
- Jon Michelet (1944 in Moss – 2018), novelist, author of crime novels, newspaper columns, and children's books
- Grynet Molvig (born 1942 in Rygge), Norwegian actress and singer
- Hanna Paulsberg (born 1987 in Rygge), jazz musician (tenor saxophone) and composer
- Johan Scharffenberg (1869 in Moss – 1965), psychiatrist, politician, speaker, and writer
- Per Schwenzen (1899 in Moss – 1984), writer of screenplays and librettos for operettas
- Arild Sibbern (1785 in Rygge – 1863), representative at the Norwegian Constituent Assembly
- Georg Sibbern (1816 in Rygge – 1901), prime minister of Norway 1858/61 and 1861/1871
- Torgrim Sørnes (born 1956 in Moss), physician, historian, and author
- Brede Bøe (born 1969, grew up in Moss), actor and politician

=== Sports ===
- Einar Jan Aas (born 1955 in Moss), former footballer with 35 caps for Norway
- Agnete Carlsen (born 1971 in Moss), former footballer with 97 caps with Norway women
- Erik Holtan (born 1969 in Moss), retired football goalkeeper with 330 club caps
- Rune Pedersen (born 1963 in Moss), former football referee
- Thomas Myhre (born 1973, grew up in Moss), retired football goalkeeper with 56 caps for Norway
- Erland Johnsen (born 1967, grew up in Moss), retired footballer with 24 caps for Norway
- Gabriel Setterblom (born 1997, grew up in Moss), handball player at the 2024 Summer Olympics, with 16 caps for Norway

== International relations ==
Number of minorities (1st and 2nd generation) in Moss by country of origin in 2017
Ancestry	Number
Poland	817
Vietnam	660
Somalia	603
Pakistan	476
Turkey	331
Sweden	323
Iraq	223
Denmark	191
Kosovo	183
Russia	162

=== Twin towns — Sister cities ===
The following cities are twinned with Moss:

- Aguacatán, Guatemala
- Blönduós, Iceland
- Horsens, Denmark
- Karlstad, Sweden
- Nokia, Finland
- Novgorod, Russia
- Virginia Beach, Virginia, United States

== Use of preposition with Moss ==
"In Moss" is translated i Moss. In the 1800s one said [on Moss] på Moss.

== In popular culture ==
- A traditional expression, [the hay scale at Moss] høyvekta på Moss, means "something that you can not trust".
- Moss is known throughout Norway for the local "dish" "Pølse i Vaffel" - sausage in waffle. The dish consists of a Vienna Sausage served in a Scandinavian style waffle with ketchup and mustard. The dish was most likely created in the 1960s, but this is widely discussed. Eyvind Hellstrøm - who later became a Michelin-star chef - and his brother Jan are often referred to as the creators. Eyvind Hellstrøm has not denied this in interviews.

== Gallery ==
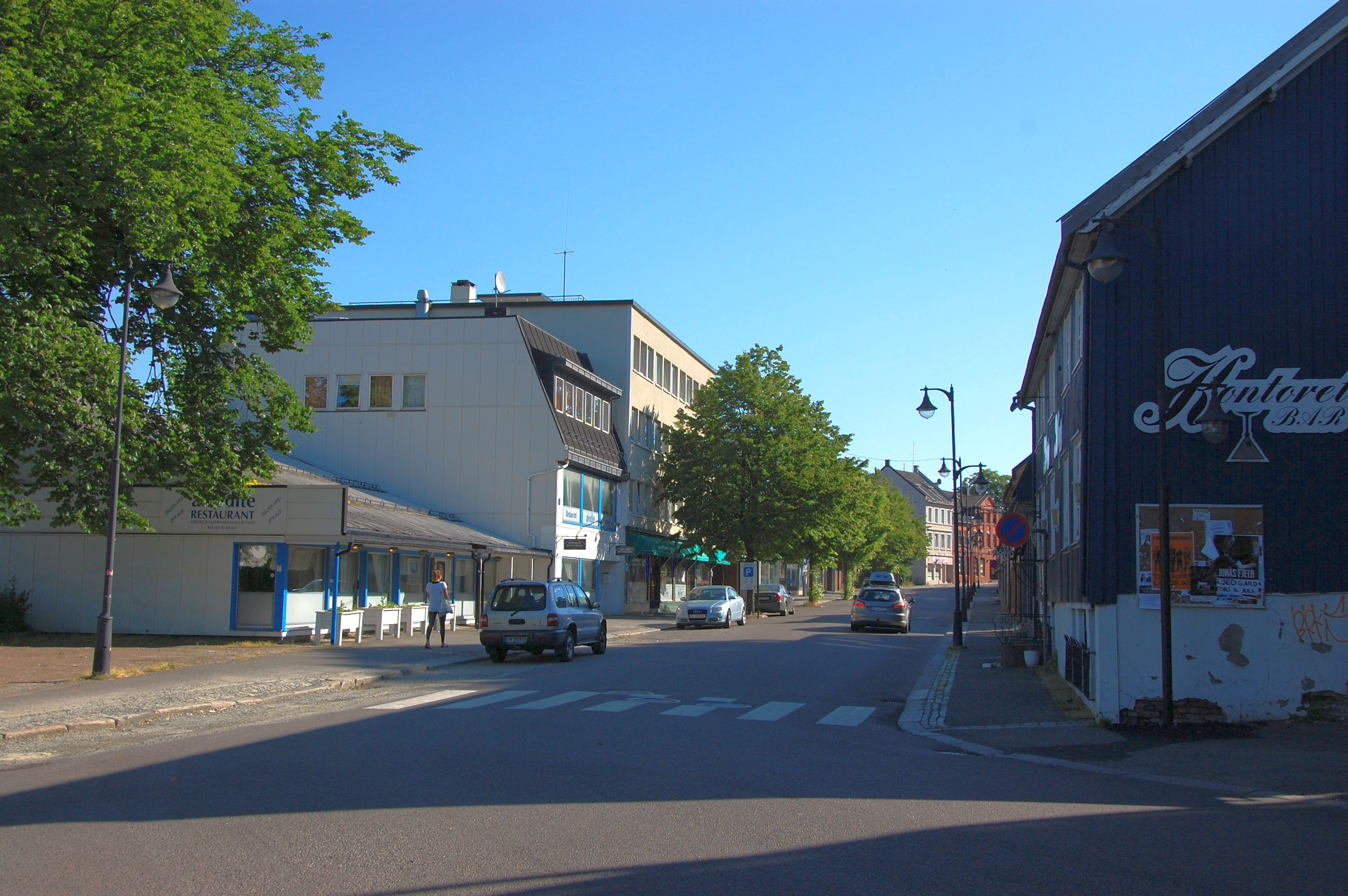
Storgata (street) in Moss

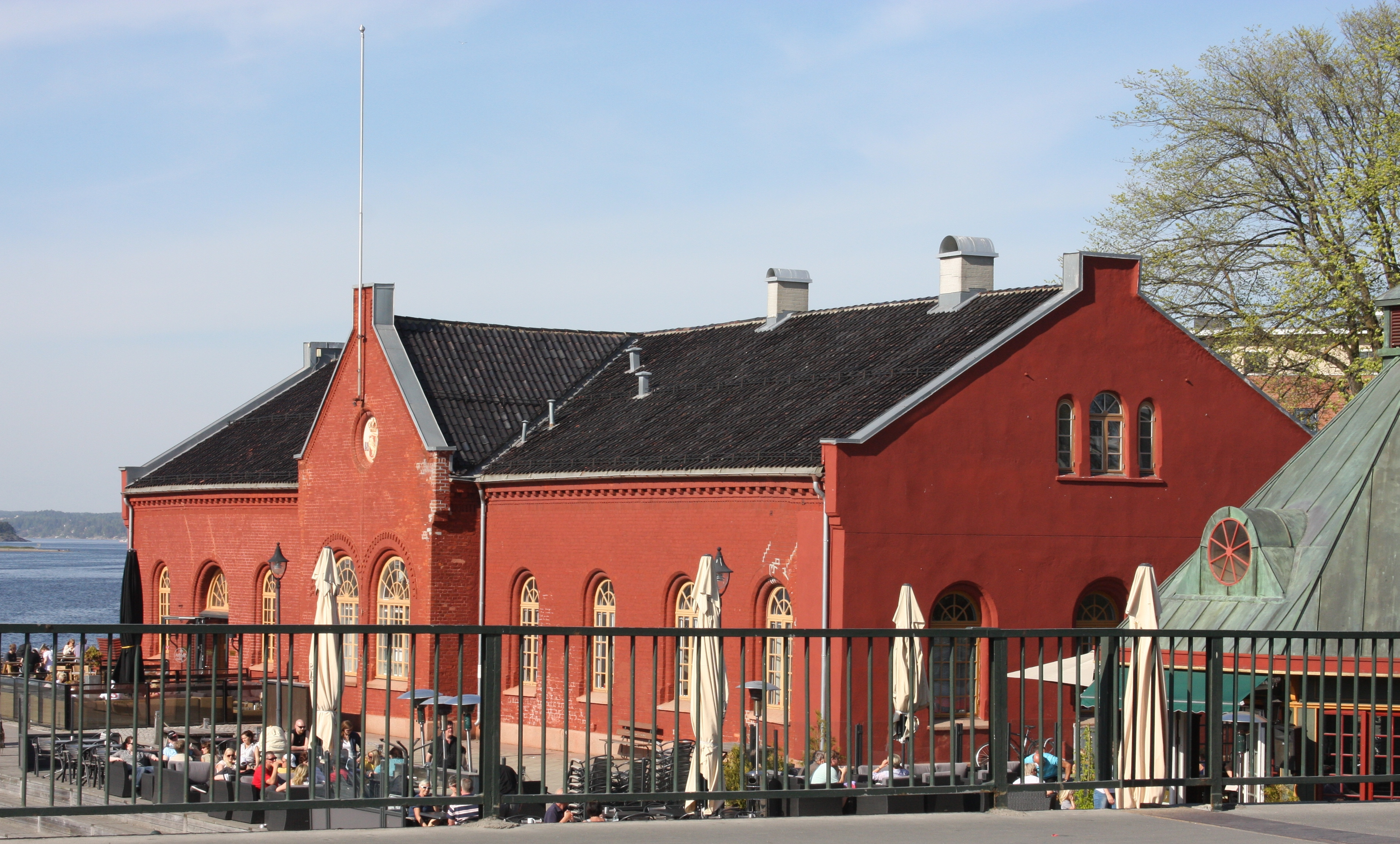
Cultural heritage building in Moss

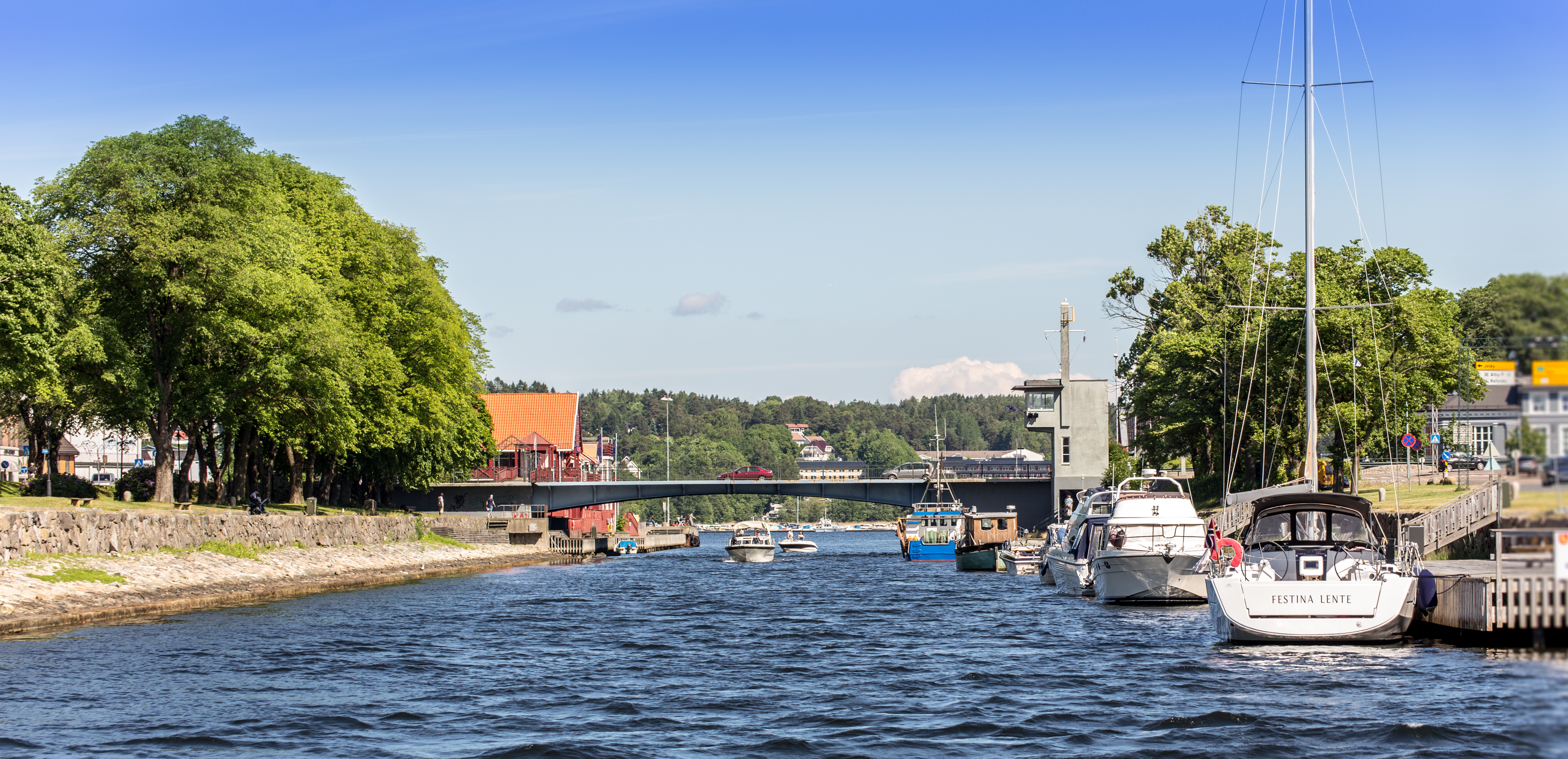
Bridge over the canal between Moss and Jeløy

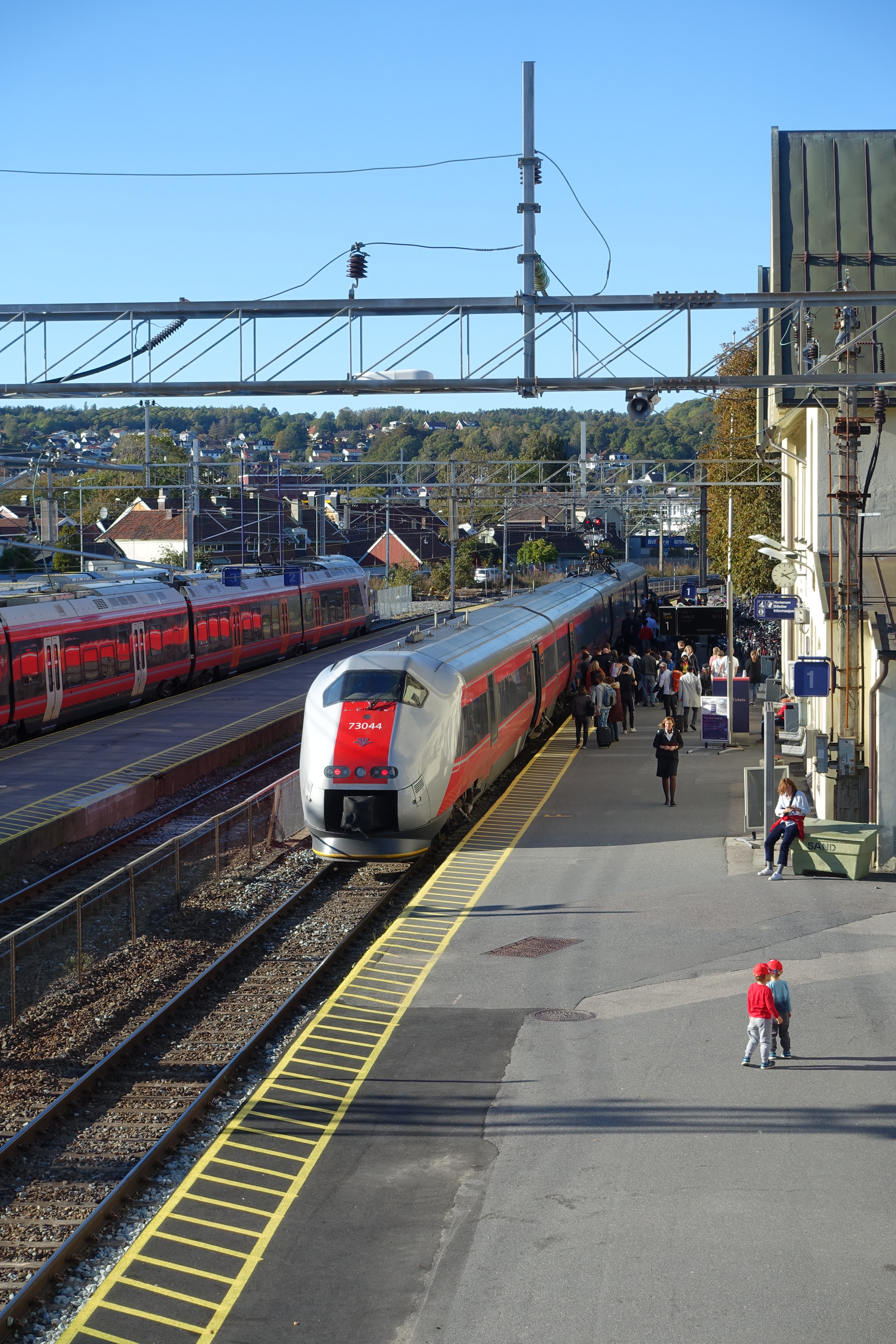
Moss railway station, 2019

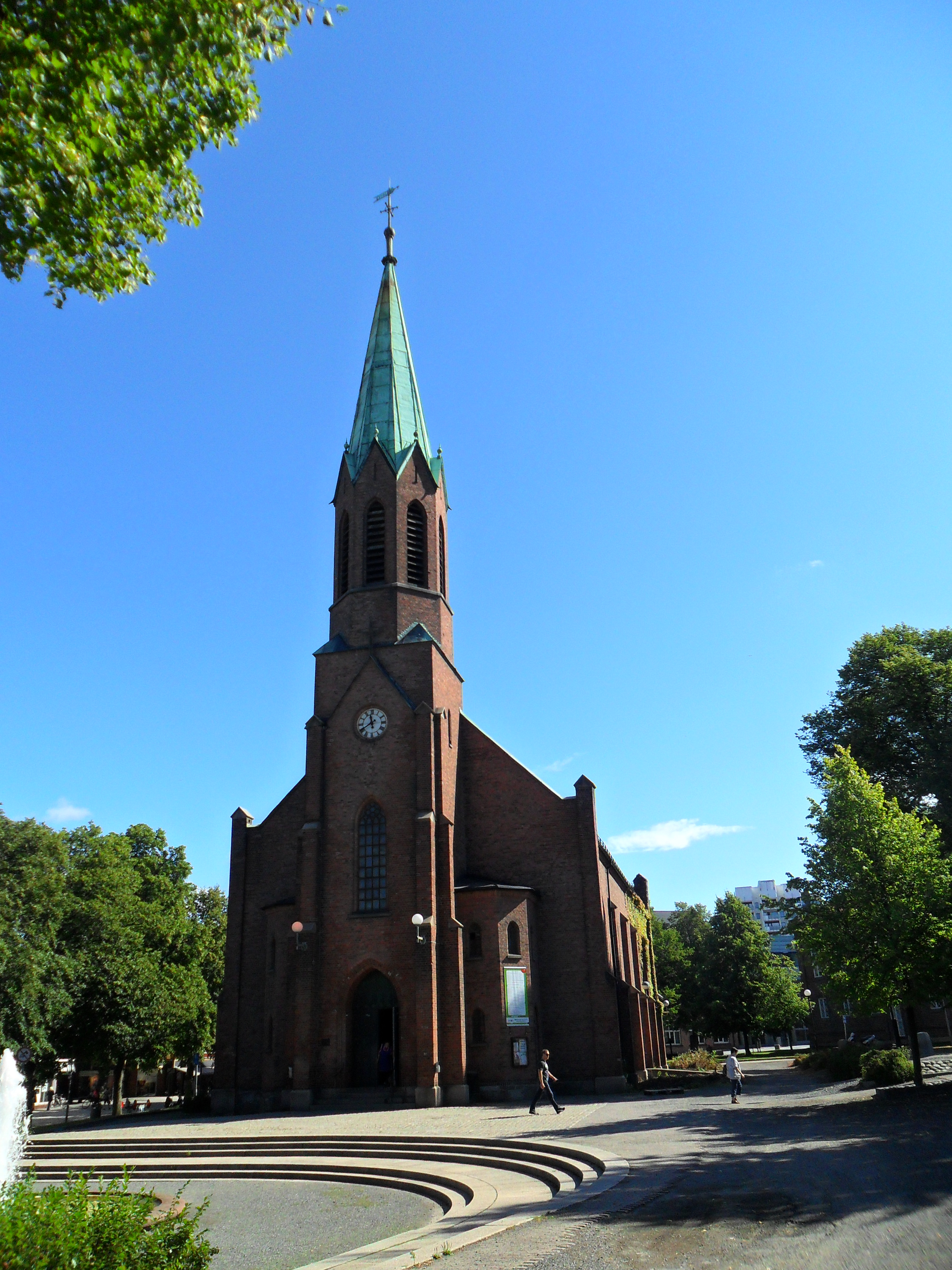
Moss Church

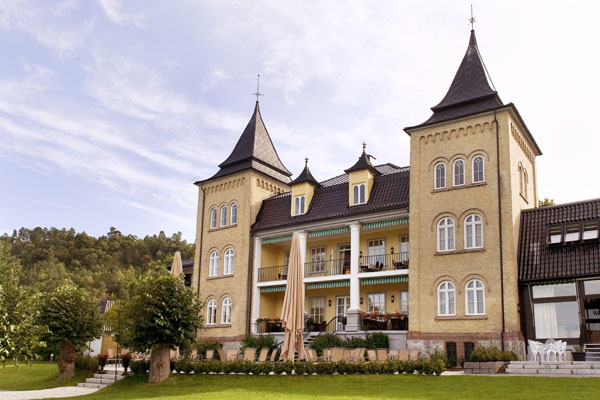
Hotel Refsnes Gods
