= Jeløy =

Former municipality in Norway

Jeløy (until 1920 named Moss herred - Moss rural district) was a former municipality in Østfold county, Norway.

Jeløy was established as a municipality January 1, 1838 (see formannskapsdistrikt). It was merged with the urban municipality of Moss on July 1, 1943. The old municipality consisted of the Jeløya peninsula/island as well as the mainland rural district surrounding Moss city.

Today we use both the name, Jeløy and Jeløya for the island in Moss.

== The name ==
The Norse forms of the name were Jalund and Jǫlund. The last element is the suffix -und (which is common in old Norwegian names of islands), but the meaning of the first element is unknown.

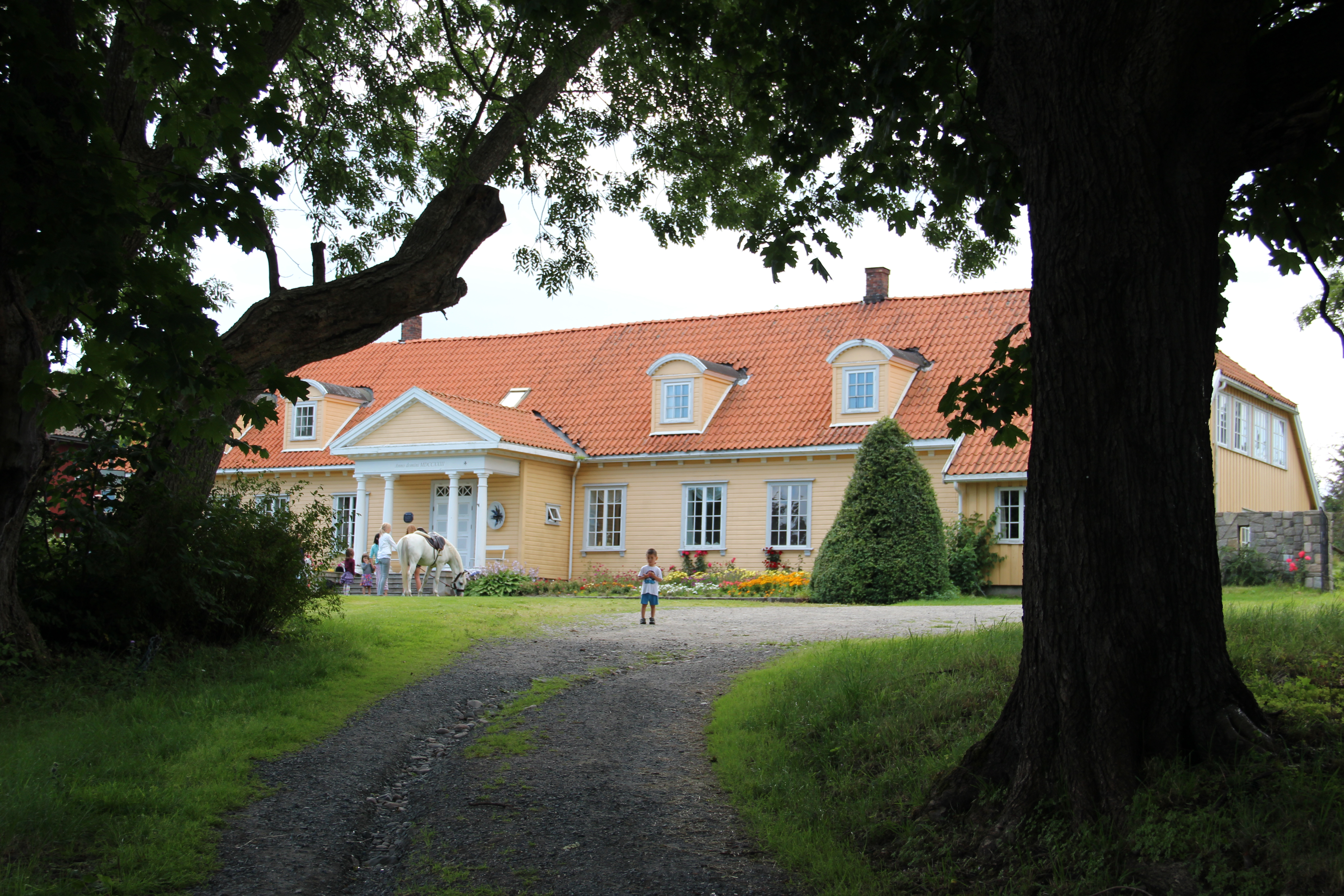
Røed gård

== Røed gård ==
Røed gård is a manor house and farm located in southern Jeløy. The buildings are almost 300 years old. Roed Manor history is known from the medieval era, at which time, St. Clemens' church (Clemenskirken) owned the farm. The manor house was built by timber merchant Just Treschow in 1723. The main building is decorated in the Baroque, Rococo, Biedermeier, Empire and Art Nouveau.
