= Change machine =

Vending machine that exchanges some denominations of currency for others

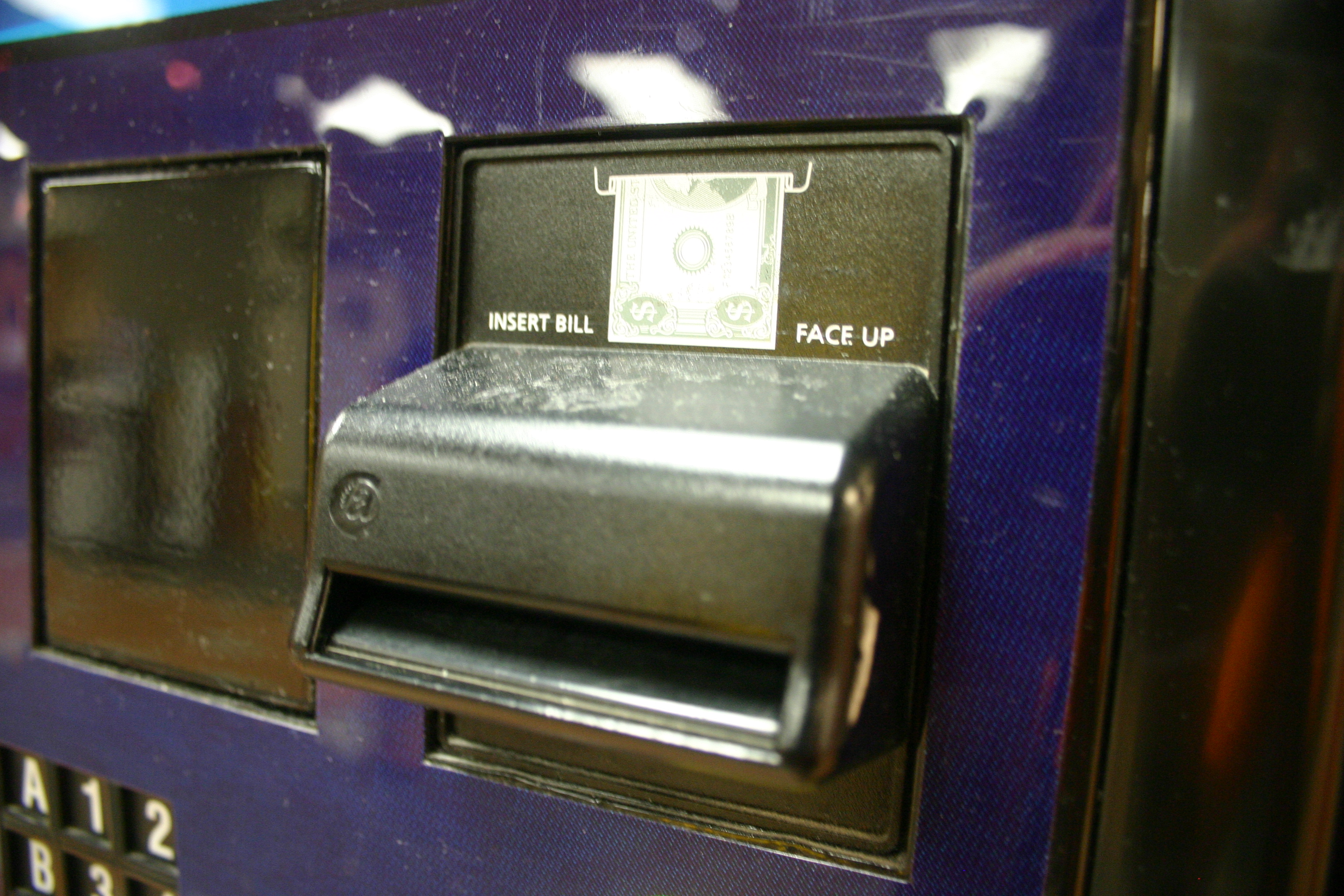
Slot to accept bills in change machine

A change machine is a type of vending machine that accepts banknotes, also referred to as paper currency, and returns an equal amount of currency in smaller bills or coins. These machines are used to provide coins in exchange for paper currency, in which case they are also known as bill changers.

In the United States, these devices are typically seen in the vicinity of machines that will not accept paper currency. This can be in a parking facility that has parking meters, in laundromats, or near vending machines that lack bill validators and do not accept paper currency.

Before the advent of coinless slot machines, casinos would sometimes have change machines that would accept paper currency and return coins or tokens that could be used in the machines. A similar arrangement has often been found at video arcades.

In some cases, a machine may subtract a small amount (e.g. 5 cents) as a surcharge for the transaction.

== See also ==
- Automated cash handling
- Manual fare collection#Coin dispenser
- Money changer
