= Currency detector =

Device that determines whether notes or coins are genuine or counterfeit

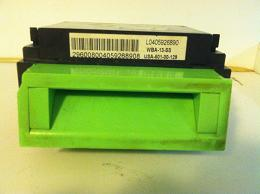
A typical US validator with a green bezel

A currency detector or currency validator is a device that determines whether notes or coins are genuine or counterfeit. These devices are used in a wide range of automated machines, such as retail kiosks, supermarket self checkout machines, arcade gaming machines, payphones, launderette washing machines, car park ticket machines, automatic fare collection machines, public transport ticket machines, and vending machines.

The process involves examining the coins and/or notes that have been inserted into the machine, and conducting various tests to determine if the currency is counterfeit. Because the parameters are different for each coin or note, these currency acceptors must be correctly programmed for each item to be accepted.

In normal operation, if any item such as a coin, banknote, card or ticket is accepted, it is retained within the machine and it falls into a storage container to allow a member of staff to collect it later when emptying the machine. If the item is rejected, the machine returns the item to the customer. If a coin is rejected, it usually falls into a tray or rolls out of a slot at the bottom where the customer can remove the coin. If a banknote, card or ticket is rejected, it is ejected out of the machine so that the customer can remove it from the slot into which it was inserted.

== Coin acceptors ==
The basic principle for coin detection is to test the physical properties of the coin against known characteristics of acceptable coins. The coin acceptor identifies the coin according to its mass, diameter, thickness, metal composition and/or magnetism, and then sends an appropriate electrical signal via its output connection. The next step is generally performed by the banknote-to-coins exchanger.

Today, sophisticated electronic coin acceptors are being used in some places that, in addition to examining the mass and size, also scan the inserted coin using optical laser beams and match the image to a pre-defined list, or test the coin's "metallic signature" based on its metallic composition.

Normal circulation coins eventually collect microscopic particles of dirt, dust, oil and grease from people's fingers. When a coin acceptor is used for a long time, thousands of coins rolling along a track will leave enough dirt, dust, oil and grease to be visible. So the coin acceptor must regularly be cleaned properly to prevent malfunction or damage. Coin acceptors are modular, so a dirty acceptor can be replaced with a clean unit, minimising downtime. The old unit is then cleaned and refurbished.

Some new types of coin acceptors are able to recognize the coins through "training", so they will support any new types of coins or tokens when correctly introduced.

== Testing methods ==
Vending and change machines use several methods of deciding whether a banknote is genuine. Adjusting these settings and the sensitivity of each is programmed via means of DIP switches on the internal circuitry.

=== Optical sensing ===
Optical sensing with a small light detector called a photocell or a miniature digital camera is one of the main techniques that vending machines use. Many countries' banknotes are pixelated—that is, their image is made out of small dots. The dots are spaced differently and have different sizes, depending on the note. The optical sensors can look for these different patterns to determine what sort of note has been inserted. Some paper money is also fluorescent: it glows when ultraviolet light is shone on it. Some machines shine an ultraviolet light on the note and measure the glow to help determine the banknote's material composition.

=== GMR sensor proximity detection ===
The particles in the ink on many countries' currency have ferromagnetic properties, including some elemental iron. The magnetic composition of the ink may be provided by carbon nanofoam in an amount of from 0.1 to 45 percent by weight of the total composition.

Notes are passed over a permanent magnet array and magnetized along their direction of travel. A magnetic sensor located several inches away with its sensitive axis parallel to the direction of travel can detect the remnant field of the ink particles.

The purpose of the biasing magnet in this case is to achieve a controlled orientation of the magnetic moments of the ink particles, resulting in a maximum and recognizable magnetic signature. Reversing the magnetizing field can actually invert the signature.

=== Physical attributes ===
The thickness and dimensions of a banknote are tested to ensure they are correct. US bank bills (notes) are 2.61 inches wide, 6.14 inches long and 0.0042 inches thick, and weigh 1 gram. Bills printed before 10 July 1929 were bigger. As the notes pass between the rollers, the voltages vary according to their thickness.

Miniature transducers, approximately 3/8 inches in diameter, offer high accuracy linear measurement in a compact space where size constraints prohibit the use of standard LVDTIs. In addition, the low-mass core is ideal for systems with low driving forces or high acceleration, and therefore will not adversely influence the delicate nature of these applications. Operating ranges are available from ± 0.005" to ± 1.00", divided into eight intermediate strokes.

Genuine Federal Reserve notes have a clear polyester thread embedded vertically in the paper. The thread is inscribed with the denomination of the note, and is visible only when held up to light. Each denomination has a unique thread position and will glow a unique color in ultraviolet (UV) light.

== Banknote acceptors ==
Also known as validators or acceptors, paper currency detectors scan paper currency using optical and magnetic sensors. Upon validation, the validator will inform the vending machine controller (VMC) or other host device of a credit via a parallel or serial interface. Various interfaces exist for the host device, including a single-line pulse interface, a multi-line parallel interface, a multi-line binary interface, and serial interfaces such as ccTalk, SSP, and MDB. Wrinkled or creased notes can cause these machines to reject them.

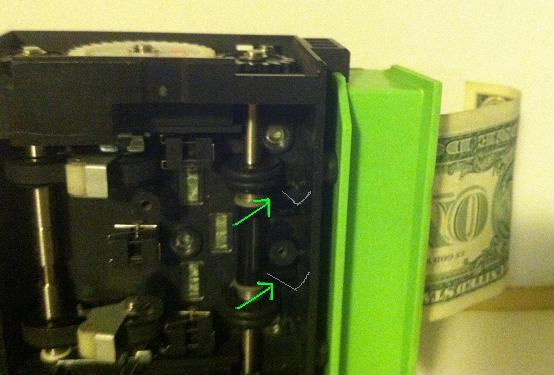
A $1 bill being passed through the acceptor mechanism. Note the pistons that grab the banknote when it detects an insert.

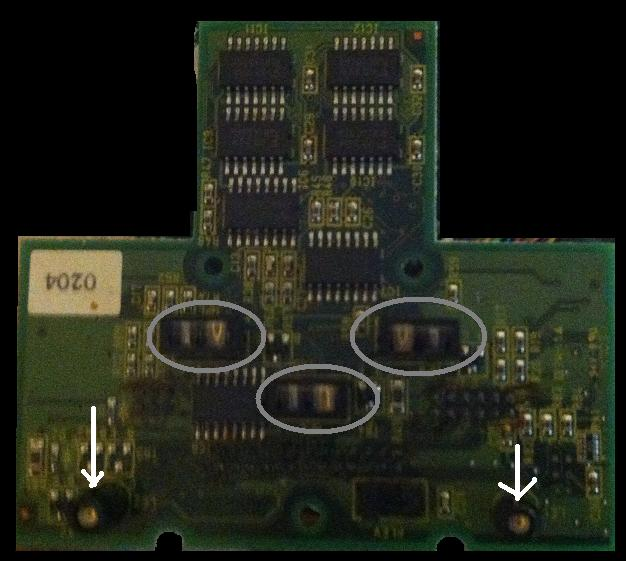
Tiny cameras are mounted on the printed circuit board

There are currently only a handful of companies manufacturing this equipment. Crane Payment Innovations (joining Crane Payment Solutions and MEI), and Japan Cash Machine (JCM) are two of the largest, each maintaining dominance in a particular market segment. Other notable companies producing this type of equipment include Coinco, Pyramid Technologies, Inc. (PTI), International Currency Technologies (ICT), Alpha CMS (Cash Management Solutions), Astrosys, Pyramid Technologies, Validation Technologies International (VTI), Innovative Technology Ltd (ITL), Global Payment Technologies (GPT) and Jofemar. Recent innovations include remote auditing and reporting by these devices as part of an Automated Cash Handling network for entertainment, banking, retail, casino and other industries.

== See also ==
- Automated cash handling
- Banknote processing
- Counterfeit banknote detection pen
- Counterfeit detector, a genre of 19th century periodical designed to facilitate visual identification of counterfeit bank notes
- EURion constellation
- Intelligent banknote neutralisation system
- Watermark
