= Automated fare collection =

Ticketing system

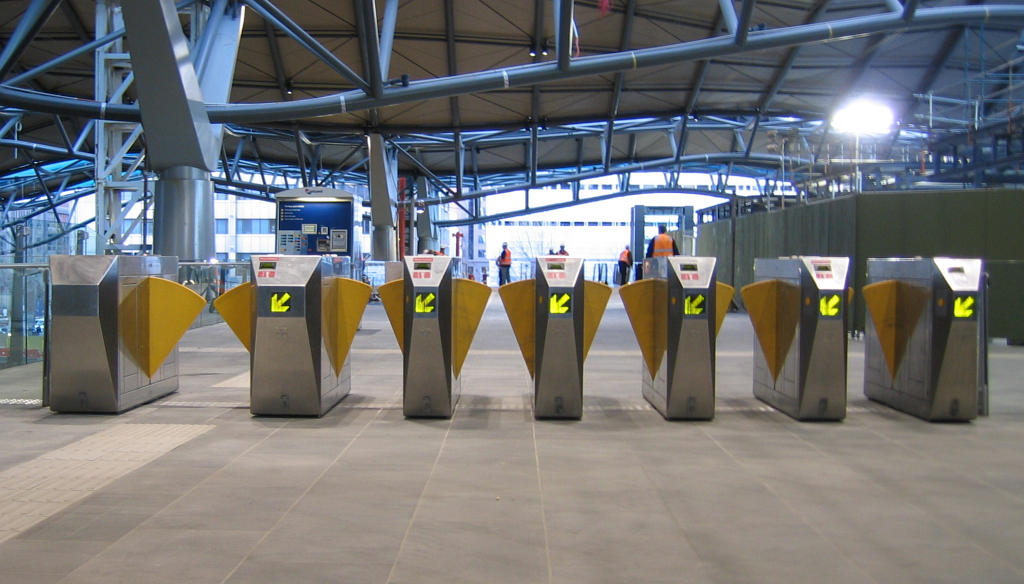
The former AFC barrier gates at Southern Cross station in the Melbourne Metcard AFC System

An automated fare collection (AFC) system is the collection of components that automate the ticketing system of a public transportation network – an automated version of manual fare collection. An AFC system is usually the basis for integrated ticketing.

== System description ==
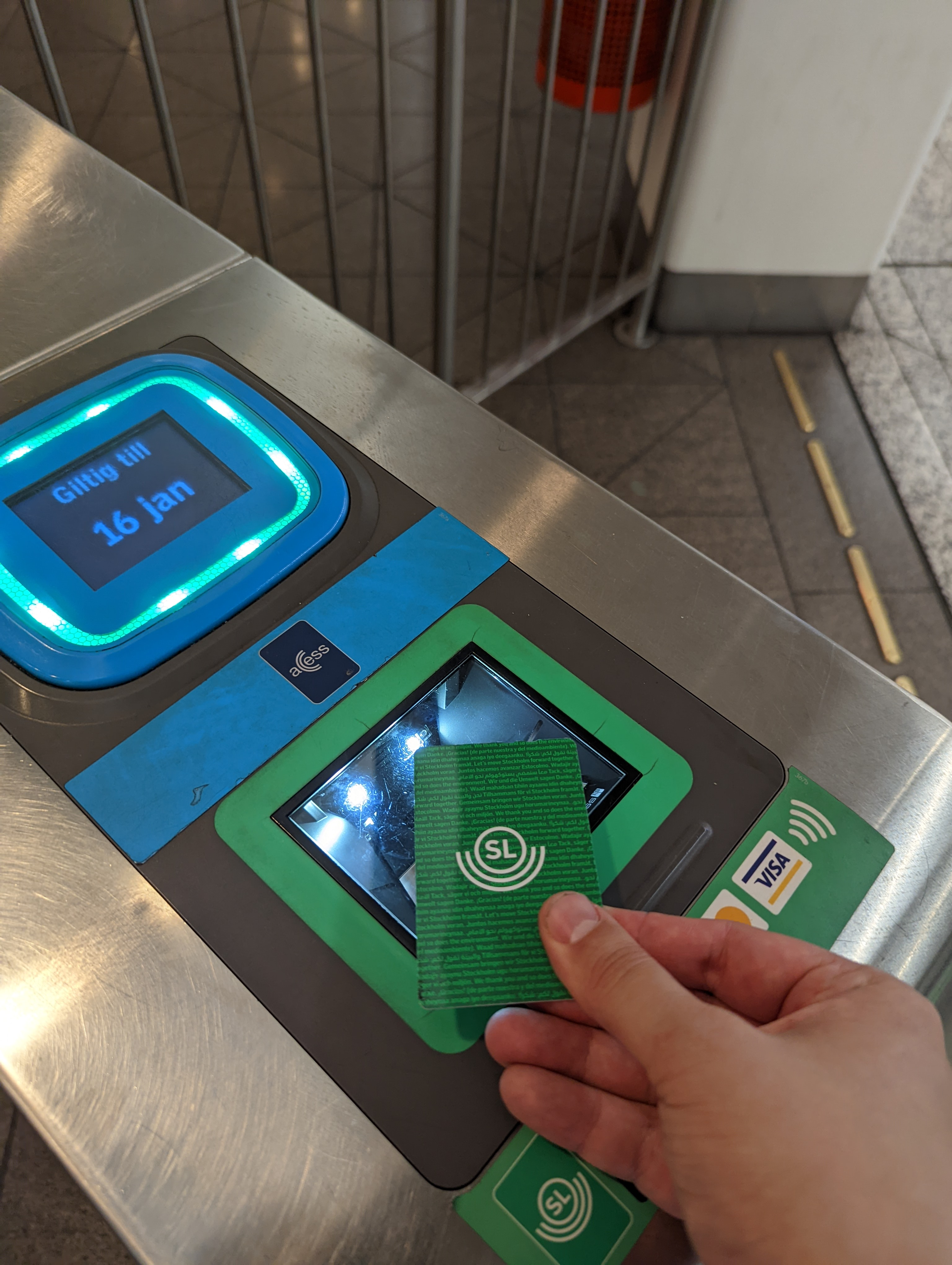
A RFID contactless transit card being validated at a ticket barrier

AFC systems often consist of the following components (the "tier" terminology is common, but not universal):

- Tier 0 – Fare media
- Tier 1 – Devices to read/write media
- Tier 2 – Depot/station computers
- Tier 3 – Back office systems
- Tier 4 – Central clearing house

In addition to processing electronic fare media, many AFC systems have equipment on vehicles and stations that accepts cash payment in some form.

=== Fare media ===
AFC systems originated with tokens or paper tickets dispensed by staff or from self-service vending machines. These have generally been replaced with magnetic stripe cards.

Since their introduction in 1996 with the Upass in Seoul, South Korea, and later with Octopus card in Hong Kong in 1997, contactless smart cards have become the standard fare media in AFC systems, though many systems support multiple media types.

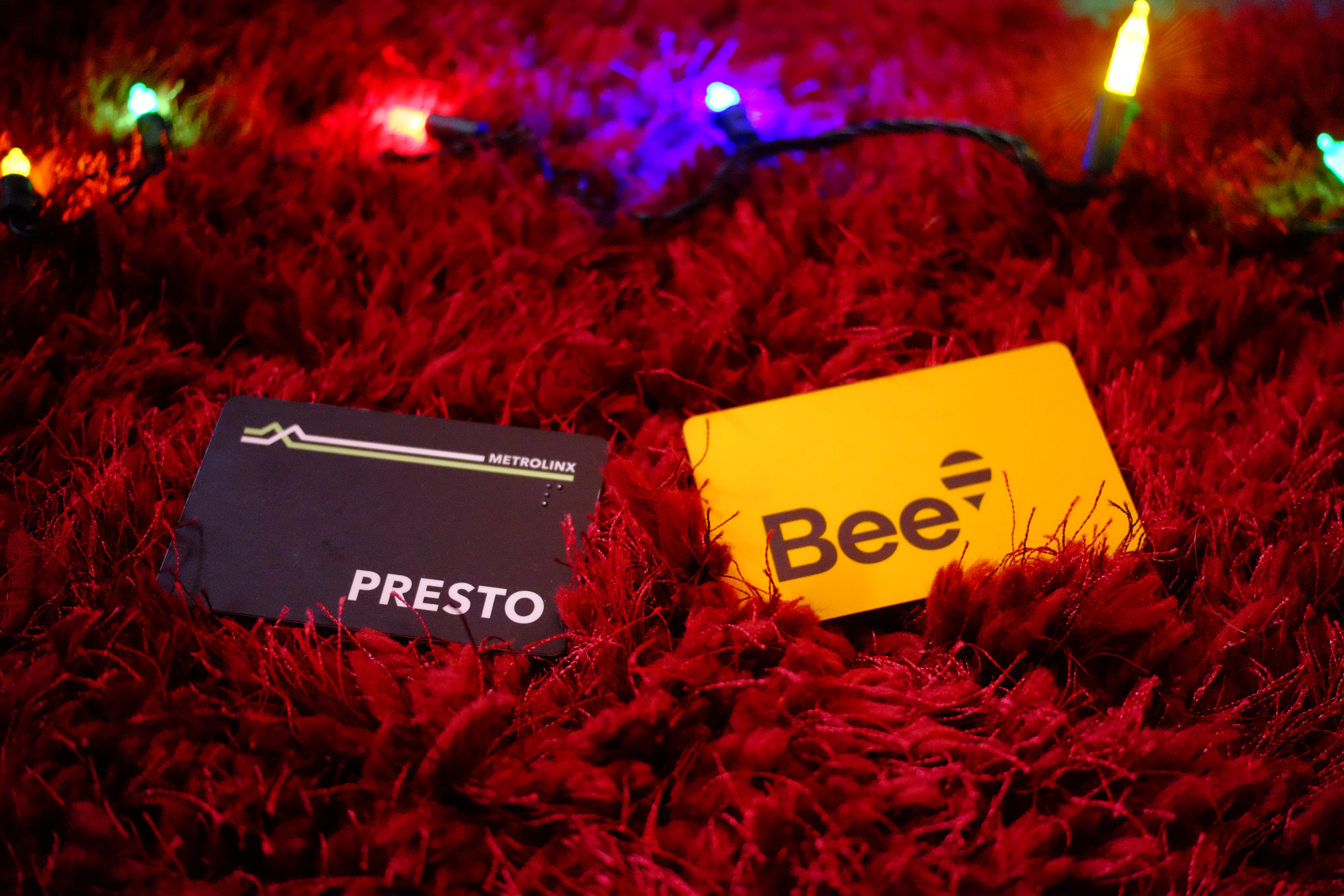
Example of two fare cards, Presto and Bee, used in Ontario and New Zealand respectively.

More recently, contactless smart cards from bank networks have been seen more frequently in AFC. As contactless digital payments become more prevalent, open-loop ticketing is gaining popularity in public transportation. With an open-loop ticketing system, passengers no longer need to purchase transport cards or tickets. Instead, they can use their cEMV bank cards or mobile wallets to directly pay for their journeys.

=== Devices to read/write media ===
These take numerous forms, including:

- Ticket office terminals – where a media holder can purchase a right to travel from staff in an office, or enquire as to the value and travel rights associated with the media

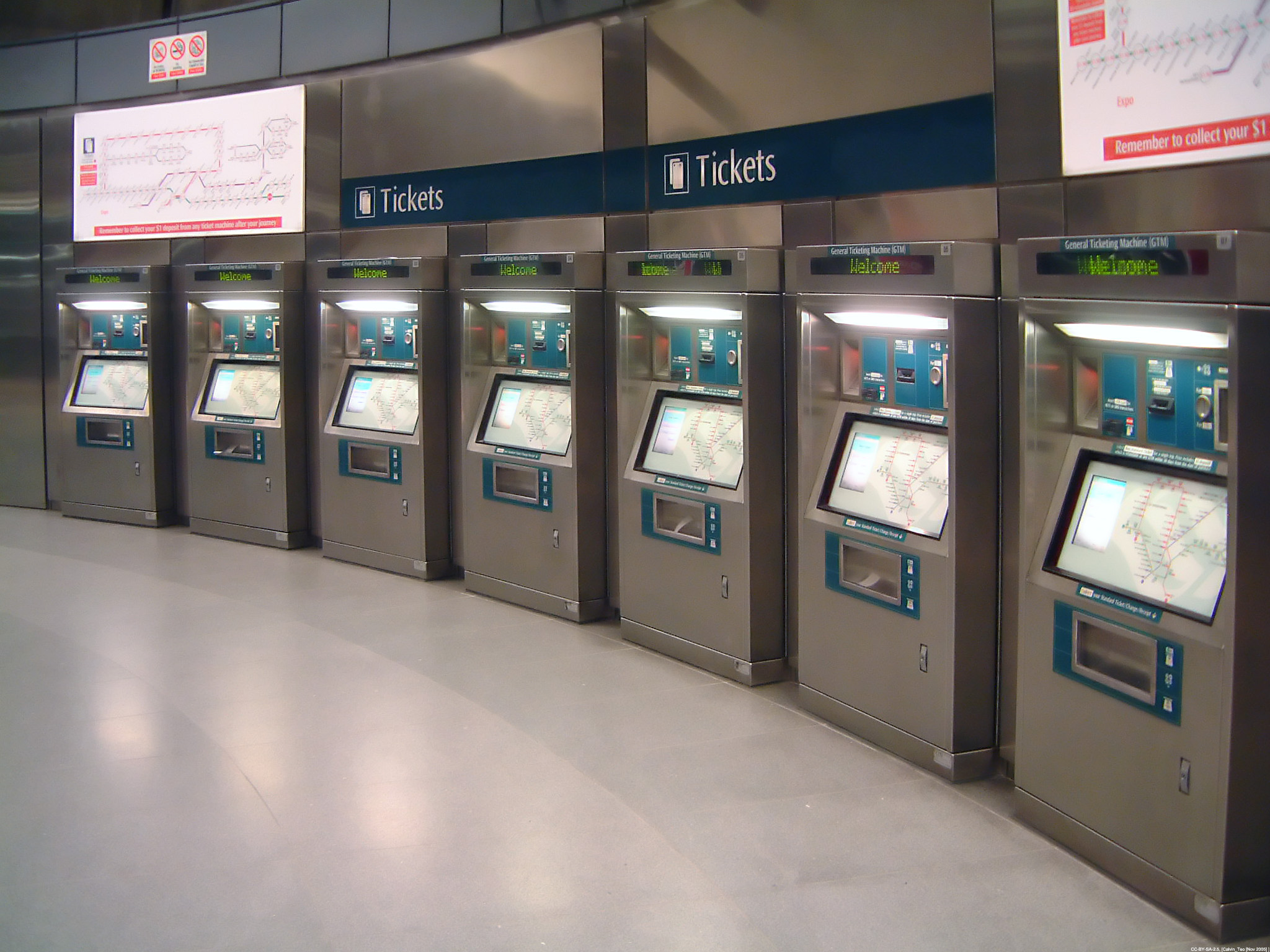
General ticketing machines at the Expo station in Singapore, where commuters can add value to their EZ-Link card or purchase a single trip ticket.

- Ticket vending machines – where a media holder can purchase a right to travel from a self-service machine, or enquire as to the value and travel rights associated with the media
- Fare gate – often used in a train station so a media holder can gain access to a paid area where travel services are provided
- Stand-alone validator – used to confirm that the media holds an appropriate travel right, and to write the usage of the media onto the media for later verification (e.g. by a conductor/inspector). Often used in proof-of-payment systems.
- On-vehicle validator – used by a media holder to confirm travel rights and board a vehicle (e.g. bus, tram, train)
- Inspector/conductor device – used by staff such as a conductor to verify travel rights

Unattended devices are often called "validators", a term which originated with devices that would stamp a date/time onto paper tickets to provide proof of valid payment for a conductor.

=== Depot/station computers ===
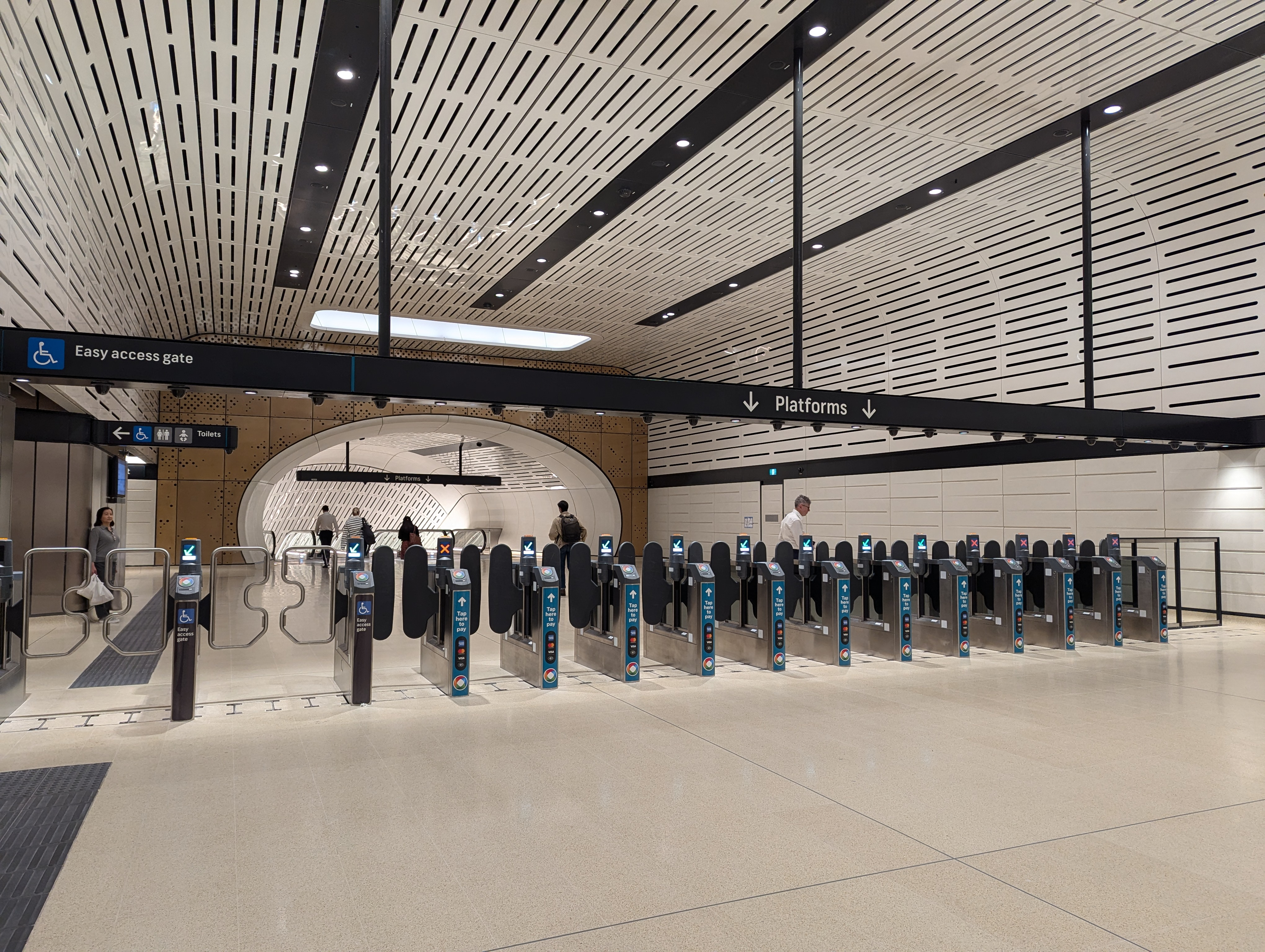
Automated Opal Card fare gates at Victoria Cross Station in Sydney

Used to concentrate data communications with devices in a station or bus depot. Common in older AFC systems where communication lines to upper tiers were slow or unreliable.

=== Back office ===
Servers and software to provide management and oversight of the AFC system. Usually includes:

- Fare management – changing of fares and fare products
- Media management – support for blacklisting of lost/stolen media
- Reporting – periodic reports on performance of the AFC system, financial details and passenger movements

=== Clearing house (Central Management System) ===
In environments where multiple system operators share common, interoperable media, a central system similar to those used in stock exchanges can be used to provide financial management and other services to the operators such as:

- Clearing and settling of funds
- Common reporting
- Apportionment of revenue between operators

== Automated fare collection in Japan ==
Japanese ticket gates feature a high-speed mechatronic component within an automated fare collection (AFC) gate responsible for processing magnetic stripe paper tickets. This mechanism is distinct from the solid-state contactless readers used for IC cards (such as Suica or FeliCa), though both systems are typically integrated into a single gate. The transport mechanism's primary function is to physically pull a ticket through a series of internal components that read, validate, write new data to, and finally either eject or capture the ticket.

These mechanisms are engineered for extremely high throughput, with Japanese railway standards often requiring a processing capability of up to 60 passengers per minute per gate.

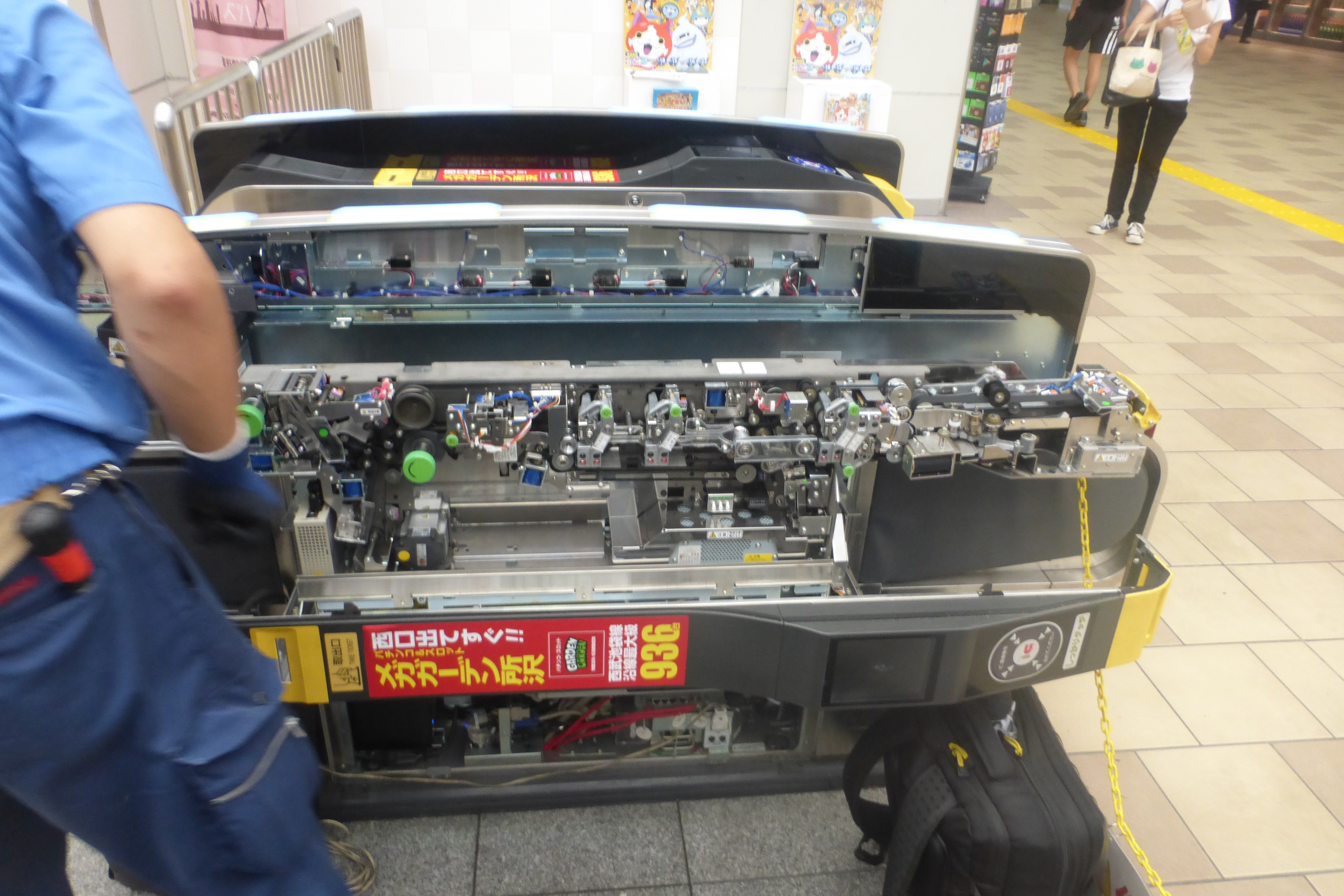
The inside workings of a Japanese automated fare collection gate, 2015

=== Core Mechanical Components ===
The internal assembly of a magnetic ticket transport system consists of several key modules:

- Ticket Separation Module: At the insertion slot, a set of high-friction rollers and belts (an "automatic separation module") is designed to grab a ticket. This module must accurately feed only one ticket at a time into the transport path, even if multiple tickets are inserted in quick succession (such as a base fare ticket and an express supplement).
- High-Speed Transport Path: A series of belts and precision rollers guides the ticket through the machine's interior at a high, constant velocity. This is critical for ensuring the magnetic read/write heads can process the data stripe accurately.
- Magnetic Read/Write Heads: The ticket is passed over one or more magnetic heads.
  - A Read Head first scans the magnetic stripe to retrieve existing data, such as the ticket's value, issuing station, and time of entry (if any).
  - A Write Head then encodes new data onto the stripe. For an entry gate, this is typically the station code and time. For an exit gate, this may be a "zeroed" value to invalidate the ticket.
- Ticket Capture/Ejection Module: After validation, a high-speed solenoid or mechanical diverter actuates. This diverter routes the ticket to one of two paths:
1. Ejection Path: The ticket is returned to the passenger at the exit slot (used for entry, or on multi-use passes).
2. Capture Path: The ticket is diverted into an internal collection bin, signifying the journey is complete and the fare has been collected.
- Sensors: A network of photo-electric cells (light beams) and mechanical sensors is used throughout the path to detect the ticket's position, prevent jams, and track the passenger's movement through the gate, ensuring the barrier flaps do not close on them.

=== Process Flow (Magnetic Ticket) ===
The mechanism's operation differs based on whether the passenger is entering or exiting a paid area.

=== Entry Process ===
1. A passenger inserts a valid ticket.
2. The separation module feeds the ticket into the transport path.
3. The read head scans the ticket to confirm its validity.
4. The internal CPU validates the ticket, and the write head encodes the current station and time data onto the magnetic stripe.
5. The ticket is routed to the ejection path and returned to the passenger, all in approximately 0.7 seconds.

=== Exit Process ===
1. A passenger inserts the ticket, which now contains entry data.
2. The read head scans the entry station and time.
3. The gate's processor calculates the required fare based on the stored journey data.
4. If the fare is valid and paid, the write head may invalidate the ticket, and the capture module solenoid diverts the ticket into the collection bin.
5. If the fare is invalid (e.g., insufficient funds), an alarm sounds, the barriers close, and the ticket is often routed back to the passenger via the ejection path.

== Automated fare collection in Canada ==
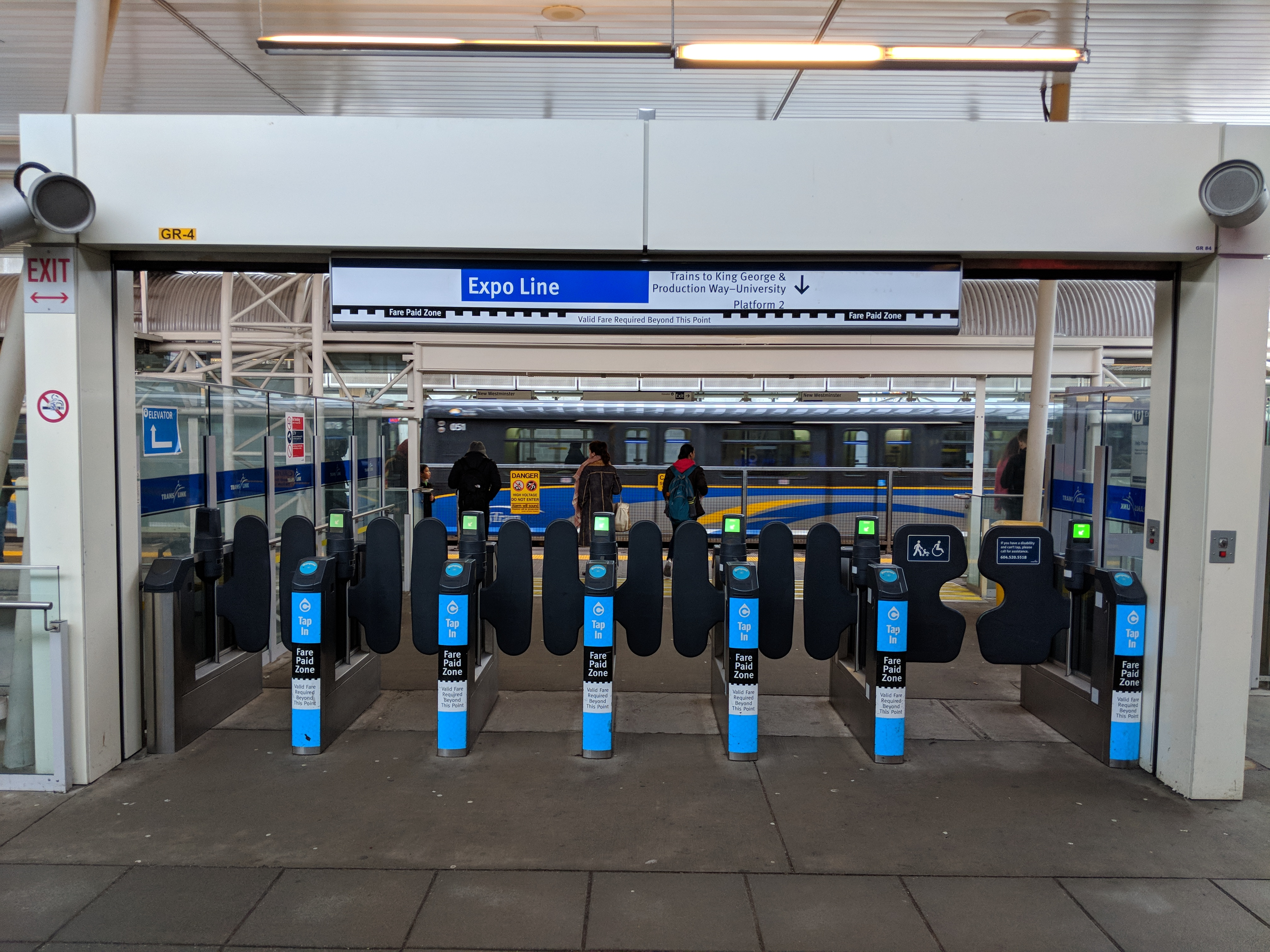
Compass fare gates that are used at train stations across the Metro Vancouver Regional District

Canada's first public transit agency, the Toronto Street Railway Co., started in 1861 with a horse-drawn streetcar service but it was not until 1912 that the City of Toronto began deliberations on fare collection. It was not until 126 years later (in 1987) that Mississauga Transit became one of the first Transit Agencies in Canada to implement an Electronic Farebox. Since then, almost every major city in Canada has adopted use of electronic fare boxes.

Notably, Canada also produces fare collection devices for various transit agencies in North America. Trapeze Group., located in Mississauga, Ontario, currently manufactures and develops high tech fare collection solutions.

== Automated fare collection in the United States ==
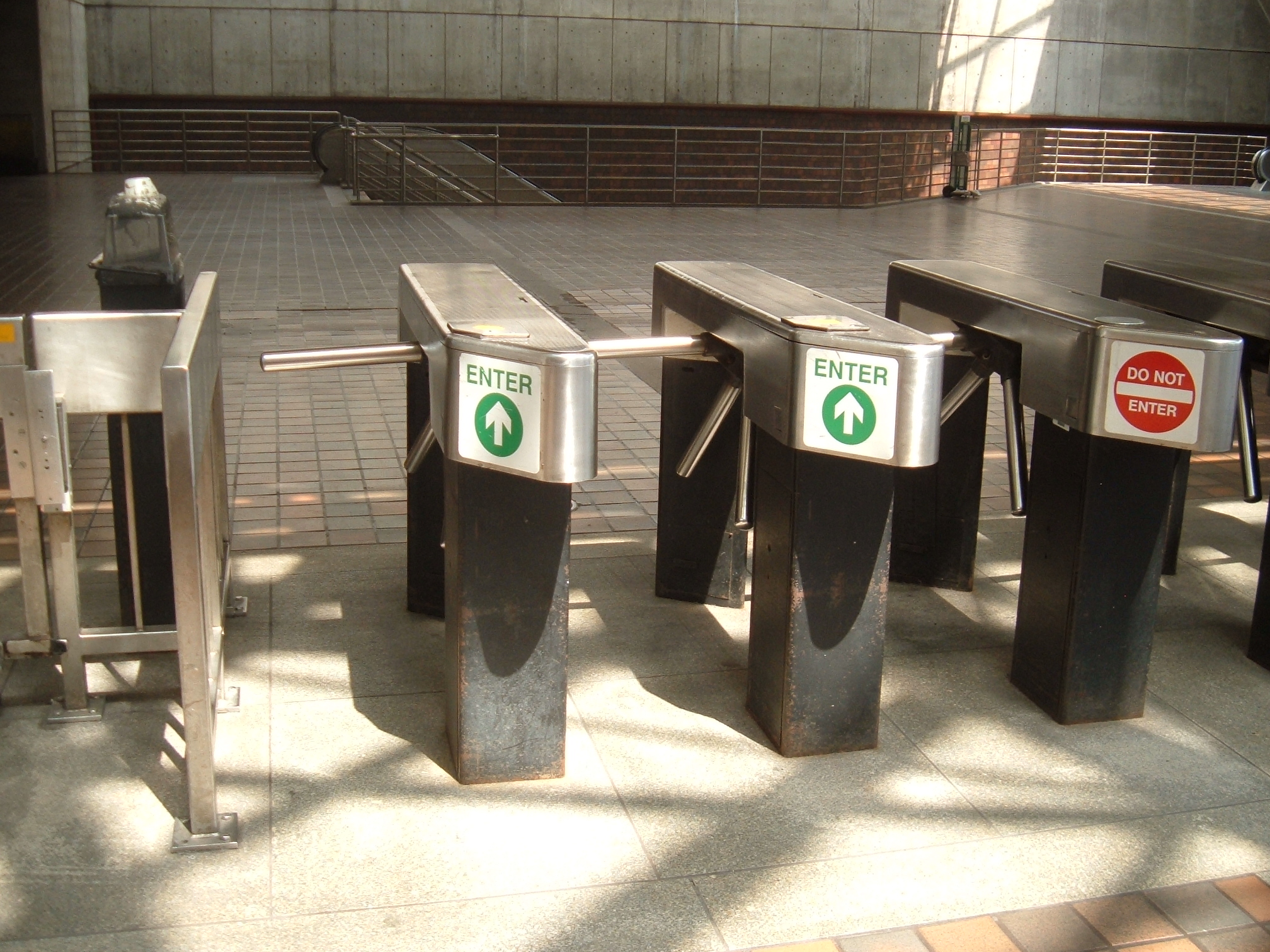
Turnstiles on the MBTA used for automated fare collection.

The first faregates in the United States were installed experimentally in 1964 at Forest Hills and Kew Gardens Long Island Rail Road stations in Queens; the first systemwide installation was on Illinois Central Railroad (IC) in 1965 for its busy Chicago commuter service (today's Metra Electric.) Financed entirely from private funds, AFC was expected to reduce operating costs by decreasing on-board crew sizes and eliminating station agents at all but the busiest stations. Cubic’s IC system featured entry-exit swipes (NX) to enforce zonal fare structures, checks against fraud, used ticket collection, and ridership/revenue data collection capabilities. It served as a prototype for the San Francisco Bay Area Rapid Transit (BART), Washington Metropolitan Area Transit Authority (WMATA), and Philadelphia’s Port Authority Transit Corporation (PATCO) Lindenwold Line NX-zonal AFC systems. These railroad-style systems required complex computer data processing on faregates or remotely on a central computer, and thus were not suitable for buses. Similar systems are still in use on Japan and Taiwan’s commuter railroads, and the London Underground.

Metropolitan Atlanta Rapid Transit Authority (MARTA)’s desire for simpler AFC systems resulted in Duncan (traditionally a parking meter vendor) developing turnstile machines for entry-only subway fare collection. Chicago Transit Authority (CTA)’s ChicagoCard, Boston Massachusetts Bay Transportation Authority (MBTA)’s previous generation “T-Pass”, and New York City Transit (NYCT)’s MetroCard systems could all be considered MARTA’s 1977 system’s conceptual descendants.

Bus fareboxes had hitherto been much simpler devices, mechanically registering coins deposited on accumulating registration counters. Duncan’s 1973 “Faretronic” farebox was the first to electronically count coins and collect revenue/ridership data by fare class. Keene quickly followed suit, introducing a design meeting Urban Mass Transit Administration (UMTA) Section 15 reporting requirements, also collecting fuel consumption and bus mileage data. In New York, mechanical fareboxes were preferred for ease of maintenance until widespread deployment of Cubic's MetroCard for buses in 1997. Venerable GFI fareboxes featuring magnetic pass readers requiring cash single fares lasted in Boston until Scheidt-Bachmann’s CharlieCard was introduced in 2006.

== Examples ==
This is a list of a few notable AFC systems. (See List of smart cards for a comprehensive list of AFC and other systems based on contactless smart cards.)

Location	Brand	Notes
Netherlands	OV-Chipkaart	This is the Dutch national AFC system. It works on all types of public transport in the whole country including Bus, Tram, Metro and Train (both regional and intercity). The system is sponsored by the Dutch government and run by Translink Systems in cooperation with individual transportation companies.
Ireland	Leap Card	Contactless smart cards for public transport
Incheon	Cashbee card	Provides a various AFC solutions and consulting services(EB Card - LDCC)
Busan	Cashbee card	Provides a various AFC solutions and consulting services(Mybi - LDCC)
London	oyster card	can be used on any TFL(transport for London) service and other transit within London
Metro Boston	Charlie card	A contactless transit card launched in November of 2004, and going into effect in December of 2006.
Tehran	E-Ticket	Contactless smart cards for transportation(Subway and Bus)+Parking meter+CharityBox
İzmir	İzmirimkart	Contactless smart cards for transportation
Istanbul	akbil/istanbulkart	Contactless smart cards for transportation, supports 14 different operators since 1995.
Seoul	T-money	Provides a various AFC solutions and consulting services
Hong Kong	Octopus card	The first to use contactless smart cards in volume
Philippines	Beep card	Intermodal AFCS solutions and smart city design
Philippines Region 3	DyipPay Revolution Corporation - Digital Pasahe Cardless	Smartphone agnostic AFCS solutions and QR code for jeepneys, tricycles design with modern technology
Ankara	AnkaraKart	Contactless smart cards for public transport
India	NCMC	Contactless smart cards for public transport
Medellín	Cívica	Contactless smart cards for public transport
Melbourne	Myki	Contactless smart cards for public transport
Sydney	Opal card	Contactless smart cards for public transport
Metro Vancouver	Compass Card	Contactless smart cards for all modes of public transit in the Metro Vancouver Regional District
Moscow	Troika card	Contactless smart cards for public transport
Singapore	EZ-Link	Supports the broadest number of modes, including tolls
Tbilisi	MetroMoney	Contactless smart cards for public transport
Southern Ontario	Presto card	Supports multiple cities in Southern Ontario, used by the majority of transit operators in the Greater Toronto, Hamilton & Ottawa Area
New York	MetroCard	A magnetic stripe system in the largest transit system in the USA
Chicago	Ventra	The largest automated fare collection contract ever placed in North America.
San Francisco Bay Area	Clipper card	Contactless smart cards for public transport
Bangladesh	SPass	Contactless smart cards in Bangladesh.
Malaysia	Touch 'n Go	Contactless smart cards Solutions provider.
Thailand	Rabbit Card	Rabbit contactless smart cards is an e-money system that can be used on the BTS and other mass transit networks.
Niagara Falls	i-Ride Card	i-Ride contactless smart card is a ride-based system that can be used in the Niagara Falls region of Ontario.
Montreal	Opus Card	Contactless smart cards for public transport
Winnipeg	Peggo Card	Contactless smart cards with online purchase and automated reload capabilities
Washington DC	SmarTrip Card	First contactless smart card for transit in the United States
Kyiv	Ridango	Automated Fare Collection System
Tallinn	Ridango	Automated Fare Collection System
Baku	Kentkart	Contactless smart cards for public transport
Doha	Kentkart	Contactless smart cards for public transport
Lahore	Kentkart	Contactless smart cards for public transport
Peshawar	SANTEL	Contactless smart cards for public transport
Athens	ATH.ENA CARD	Contactless smart cards for public transport

== See also ==
- Calypso, an international electronic ticketing standard, originally designed by a group of transit operators
- CIPURSE, is an open security standard for transit fare collection systems
