= Jiagedaqi District =

Jiagedaqi 加格达奇(行政)区
- Administrative Zone
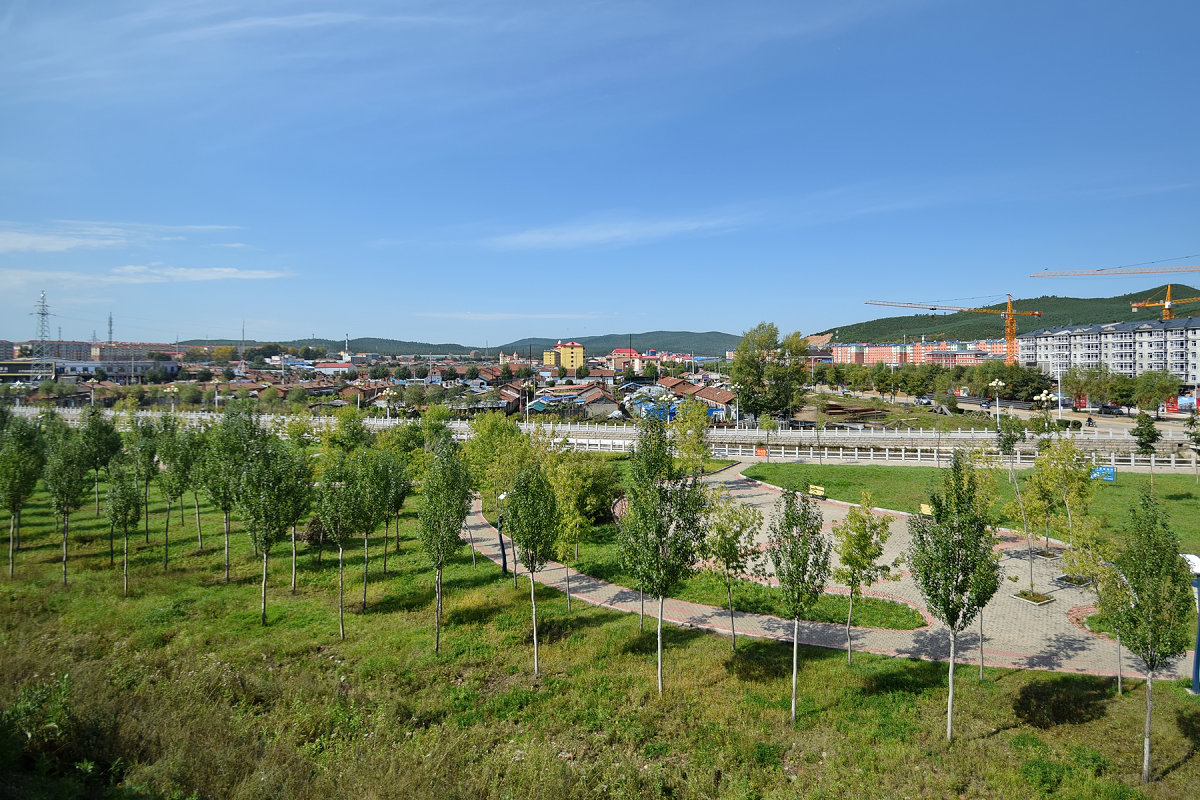

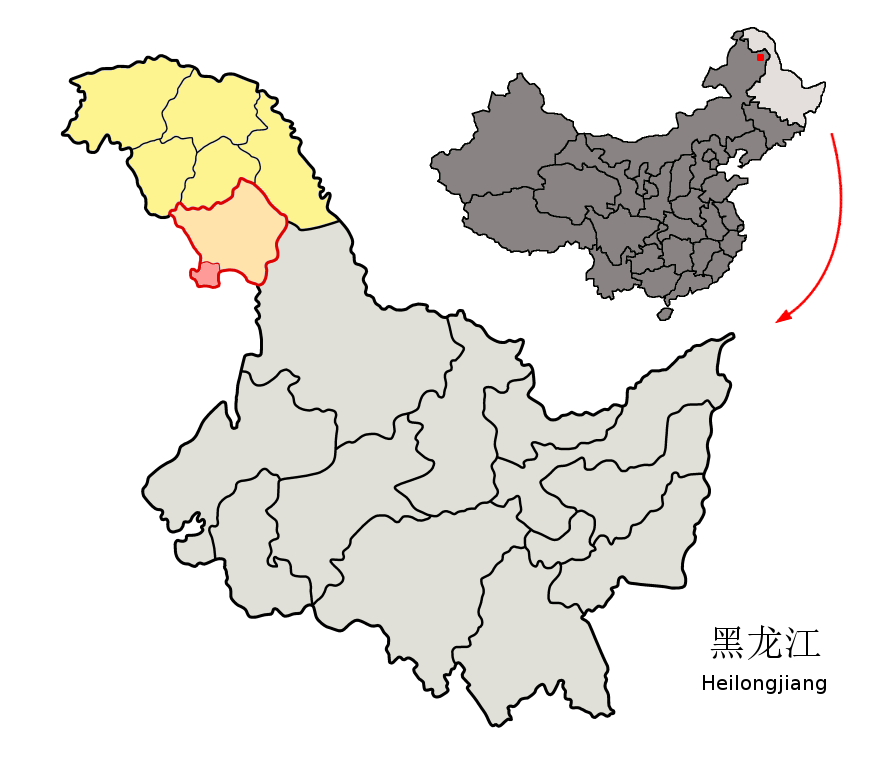
- Location of the district (red outline) in Daxing'anling Prefecture (yellow fill) and Heilongjiang

- Location of the district seat relative to Heilongjiang Jiagedaqi (Inner Mongolia)
- Coordinates (Jiagedaqi District government): 50°24′31″N 124°08′23″E
- Country: China
- Province: Heilongjiang
- Prefecture: Daxing'anling
- District seat: Changhong Subdistrict

Area
  - Total: 1,587 km^{2} (613 sq mi)
- Elevation: 472 m (1,549 ft)

Population (2020 census)
  - Total: 137,105
  - Density: 86.39/km^{2} (223.8/sq mi)
- Time zone: UTC+8 (China Standard)
- Postal code: 165000
- Area code: 0457
- Website: www.jgdq.gov.cn

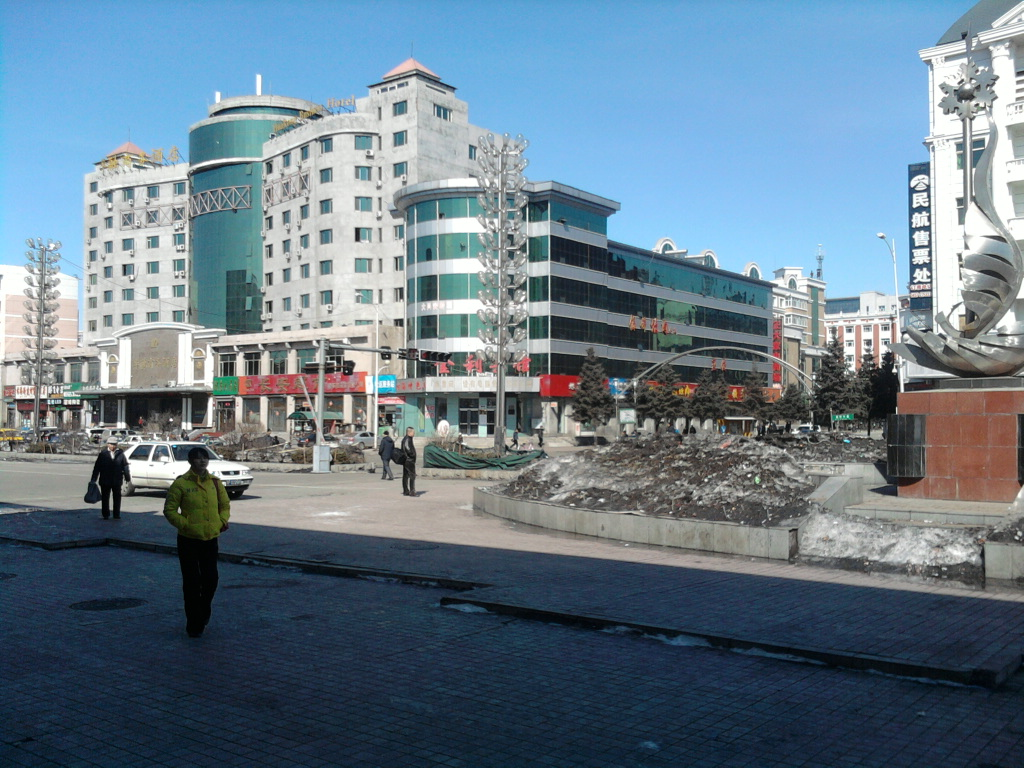
Zhanqian Street

Jiagedaqi District or Jagdaqi District (Oroqen: Jagdaqi, meaning "area with Pinus sylvestris var. mongolica Litvin"; simplified Chinese: 加格达奇区; traditional Chinese: 加格達奇區; pinyin: Jiāgédáqí Qū) is a district and the de facto seat of Daxing'anling Prefecture in Heilongjiang. Its physical location is in Oroqen Autonomous Banner, Hulunbuir, Inner Mongolia; however, it is de facto under the jurisdiction of Daxing'anling Prefecture due to a lack of a suitable location for a seat in Daxing'anling itself. The government of Inner Mongolia disputes this arrangement.

== Administrative divisions ==
Jiagedaqi District is divided into 6 subdistricts and 2 townships:

- Dongshan Subdistrict (东山街道)
- Weidong Subdistrict (卫东街道)
- Hongqi Subdistrict (红旗街道)
- Changhong Subdistrict (长虹街道)
- Shuguang Subdistrict (曙光街道)
- Guangming Subdistrict (光明街道)
- Jiabei Township (加北乡)
- Baihua Township (白桦乡)

== Climate ==
Climate data for Jiagedaqi, elevation 372 m (1,220 ft), (1991–2020 normals, extremes 1981–2010)
Month	Jan	Feb	Mar	Apr	May	Jun	Jul	Aug	Sep	Oct	Nov	Dec	Year
Record high °C (°F)	−1.0 (30.2)	6.4 (43.5)	19.2 (66.6)	27.8 (82.0)	35.2 (95.4)	39.7 (103.5)	37.2 (99.0)	36.1 (97.0)	31.0 (87.8)	25.3 (77.5)	13.1 (55.6)	0.5 (32.9)	39.7 (103.5)
Mean daily maximum °C (°F)	−14.1 (6.6)	−8.4 (16.9)	0.1 (32.2)	10.7 (51.3)	19.1 (66.4)	24.8 (76.6)	26.5 (79.7)	24.3 (75.7)	18.3 (64.9)	8.4 (47.1)	−5.3 (22.5)	−14.3 (6.3)	7.5 (45.5)
Daily mean °C (°F)	−21.9 (−7.4)	−17.5 (0.5)	−8.0 (17.6)	3.4 (38.1)	11.5 (52.7)	17.3 (63.1)	20.0 (68.0)	17.5 (63.5)	10.4 (50.7)	1.1 (34.0)	−12.2 (10.0)	−21.0 (−5.8)	0.1 (32.1)
Mean daily minimum °C (°F)	−27.9 (−18.2)	−24.9 (−12.8)	−15.5 (4.1)	−3.9 (25.0)	3.5 (38.3)	10.1 (50.2)	14.4 (57.9)	12.2 (54.0)	4.3 (39.7)	−4.7 (23.5)	−17.8 (0.0)	−26.6 (−15.9)	−6.4 (20.5)
Record low °C (°F)	−43.1 (−45.6)	−42.8 (−45.0)	−32.3 (−26.1)	−19.8 (−3.6)	−9.0 (15.8)	−5.6 (21.9)	0.7 (33.3)	−0.7 (30.7)	−8.7 (16.3)	−24.7 (−12.5)	−37.5 (−35.5)	−43.7 (−46.7)	−43.7 (−46.7)
Average precipitation mm (inches)	4.7 (0.19)	3.6 (0.14)	6.9 (0.27)	19.4 (0.76)	47.1 (1.85)	91.1 (3.59)	155.2 (6.11)	119.0 (4.69)	65.1 (2.56)	23.5 (0.93)	10.3 (0.41)	7.0 (0.28)	552.9 (21.78)
Average precipitation days (≥ 0.1 mm)	6.2	4.2	5.2	5.9	10.2	14.2	16.0	14.5	10.0	6.6	6.4	7.3	106.7
Average snowy days	8.2	6.5	7.8	6.3	0.8	0.1	0	0	0.3	5.3	8.4	9.9	53.6
Average relative humidity (%)	68	64	57	50	52	69	78	80	73	62	69	71	66
Mean monthly sunshine hours	179.0	210.0	259.6	247.4	252.0	249.8	230.1	222.8	213.5	198.7	171.1	156.8	2,590.8
Percentage possible sunshine	67	73	70	59	52	51	47	50	57	61	64	63	60
Source: China Meteorological Administration

== Transport ==
- Daxing'anling Oroqen Airport
- China National Highway 111
- Inner Mongolia Provincial Highway 301
- Nenjiang-Greater Khingan Forest (Nenlin) Railway
- Jiagedaqi railway station
