= MEI Conlux =

- Company type: Division
- Industry: Machinery
- Founded: ("Mars Electronics International"); 1965
- Headquarters: Malvern, Pennsylvania, U.S.
- Area served: North America, Europe, various other locations
- Products: Currency detection, including Automated teller machine, and Vending Machines
- Parent: Crane & Co. (since 2012)
- Website: www.cranepi.com/en

MEI Conlux (formerly known as Mars Electronics International) is a manufacturer of electronic banknote validators, coin acceptors and changers. MEI was spun off to private investment interests in July 2006. In December 2012, it was sold to Crane Co., which also manufactures vending machines. A new division was created inside the company by merging former CPS (Crane Payment Solutions) and MEI into CPI (Crane Payment Innovations).

The firm began operations in Great Britain in 1965 and expanded to the United States in 1967. The firm invented the electronic vending machine and is one of the largest manufacturers of vending machines in the world. As of 2011, the company operated in over one hundred countries and processed over two billion transactions per week.

It has had a co-educational relationship with the Mechanical Engineering department of the Imperial College, London.

In 1996, the firm signed a deal with DigiCash, one of the first digital currencies. This led to the widespread integration of smart card technology in vending machines.

Since 2000, the company has been the sole manufacturer of bill handling units (a form of automated cash handling) for the Federal Transit Administration.
