= Manual fare collection =

Fare collection without the use of automated machines

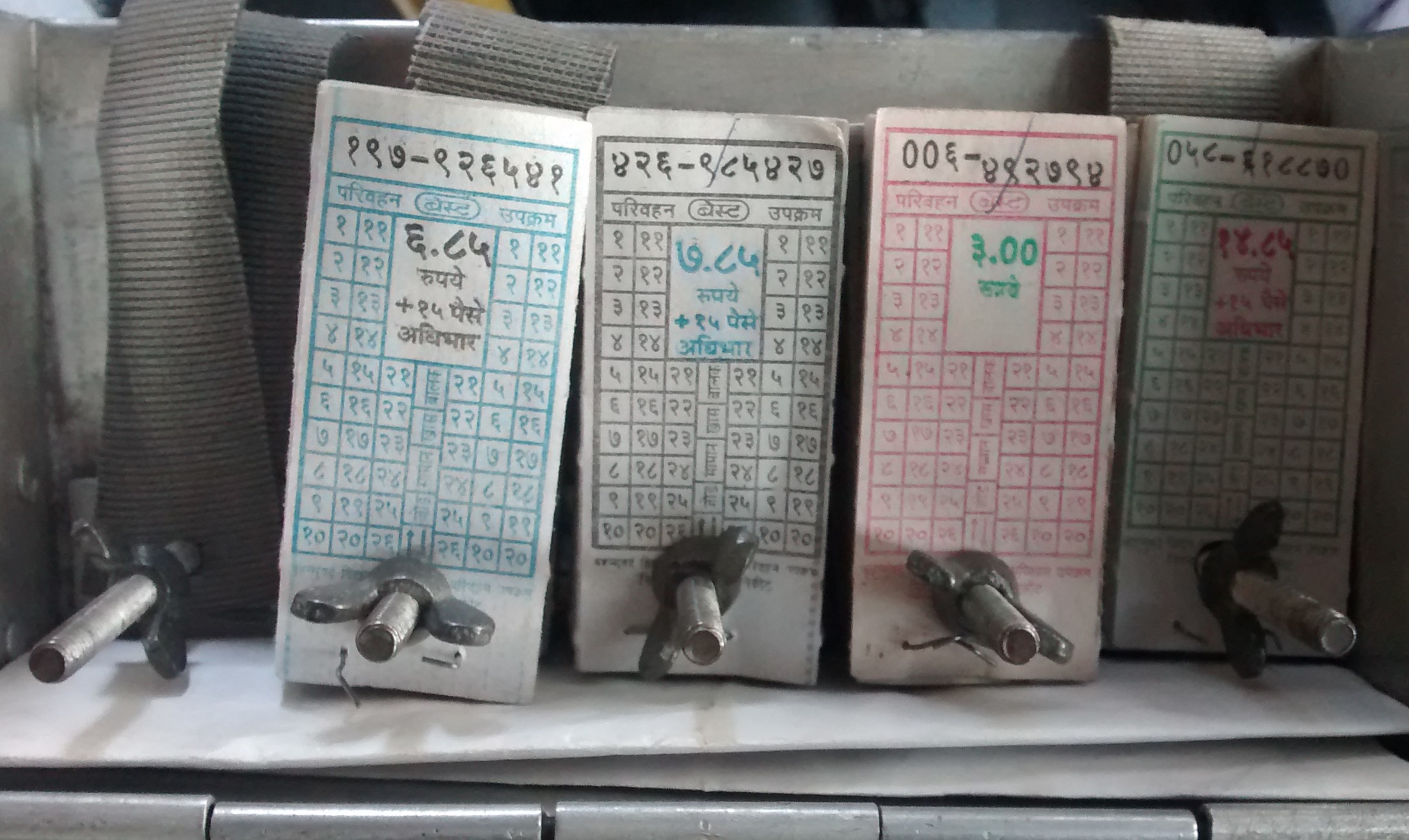
A ticket box with tickets waiting to be punched in a BEST Bus in Mumbai, India.

Manual fare collection is the practice of collecting fares manually (without the aid of an automated machine). "Fare collection" generally refers to the collection of fares in the transport industry in return for a ticket or passes to travel. Commonly used on buses and train transport systems (in the UK; in Poland, for example, buying and validating the tickets by machine is the passenger's task; the passengers enter the bus through any of the doors and buying a ticket from the driver is an option where there is no automatic selling machine or if somebody forgets to buy a ticket before), manual fare collection is increasingly becoming obsolete with the introduction of smart cards such as the Transport for London 'Oyster card'. However, in the face of this trend, some companies have opted to retain more traditional methods of manual fare collection to both save money (automatic equipment is expensive) and ensure reliability. In the United Kingdom, examples of this can be seen on the Transport for London Heritage lines and the FirstGroup FTR routes in York, Leeds, Luton, and Swansea where bus conductors (dubbed 'customer hosts') have returned to work. The other reason(with lowering prices of electronics, and in most cases need to buy it once) may be for Heritage routes - tradition "look", for other routes(because of quite high monthly labor cost in UK) agreements and strong unions with the tries from politics to lower the unemployment rate by making overworking in public service.

In China, some rural China Railway Classic Rail routes, such as the once-daily slow train between Jiagedaqi and Gulian (west of Mohe) in the north end of the country, use manual fare collection onboard the train, since many stops along the line do not have ticket offices or gates. Tickets for trips at these small stops are not sold on 12306.cn, China Railway's official website. Instead, passengers present their ID cards on the train to the conductor and pay in cash or by WeChat Pay or Alipay, and the conductor will issue an e-ticket onboard the train.

== Equipment ==
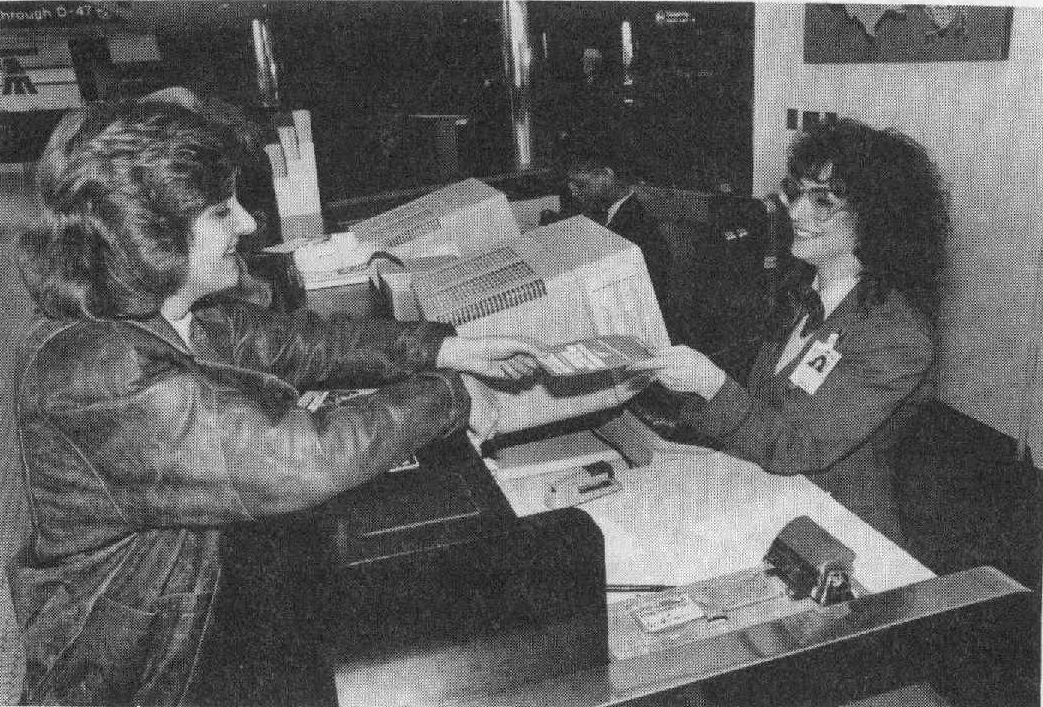
Airline ticket agent at work. (1992)

A range of fare collection equipment has been developed over the last century in the United Kingdom.

=== Cash bag ===
A conductor may carry a cash bag in which cash is kept, thus making it easier while issuing tickets.

=== Coin dispenser ===
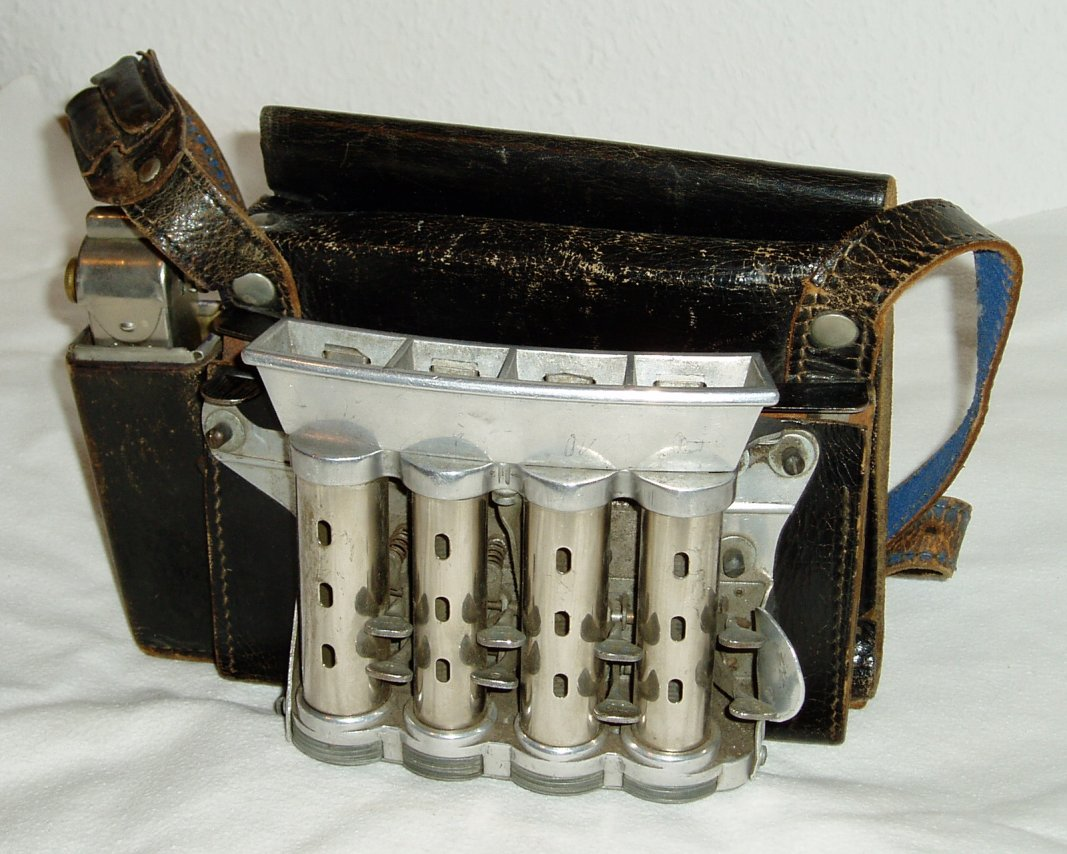
Coin dispenser

Perhaps the biggest development in manual fare collection is the coin dispenser, distributed by Jacques L. Galef. Mounted either in a driver's cab or on the belt of a conductor, the coin dispenser usually takes the form of a number of tubes fitted in a line together. Each tube holds a different denomination and tends to have some sort of trigger which will release the coin from the bottom. In Britain, the Quick-Change and Pendamatic units, for example, has labelled plastic funnels at the top, which filter the coins into the tube. A trigger on the front of the machine then releases the coin by pushing a kicker, which holds the coin, forward in a pivotal motion. Other models in Britain, the Cambist and Metro Coin Dispensers, works on a similar principle but also have the option to be attached to the fare collection table allowing the operator (usually the bus driver) to simply slide the coins into the respective tubes. Generally, coin dispensers in the UK are configured with the £1 coin to the left (as the machine faces you), then the 50p, 20p, 10p, 5p, 2p, 1p. However, some operators have customised their dispensers to better suit their individual needs.

=== Tender tray ===
Other fare collecting equipment includes tender trays which can be fitted to bus driver doors to allow the customer to put the fare down. These are common on most buses in the United Kingdom now, since they facilitate quick payment and also allow for the driver to have a screen protecting his cab, yet still securely collect change (the tray is placed with a small gap above it to allow room for the drivers hand to pass through).

== See also ==
- Automated cash handling
- Automated fare collection system
