= Calypso (electronic ticketing system) =

Electronic ticketing standard for microprocessor contactless smart cards

Calypso is an international electronic ticketing standard for microprocessor contactless smart cards, originally designed by a group of transit operators from 11 countries including Belgium, Canada, France, Germany, Italy, Latvia, México, Portugal and others. It ensures multi-sources of compatible products, and allows for interoperability between several transport operators in the same area.

== History ==
Calypso was born in 1993 from a partnership between the Paris transit operator RATP and Innovatron, a company owned by the French smartcard inventor, Roland Moreno. The key features of the scheme were patented by Innovatron. Most European transit operators from Belgium, Germany, France, Italy and Portugal eventually joined the group in the following years. The first use of the technology was in 1996.

In the same time, the international standard ISO/IEC 14443 for contactless smart cards was being designed, and the actors of Calypso strongly lobbied to have their technology included in the standard, but Innovatron's patents—and the price of the related royalties—were not compliant with ISO's policy. Therefore, despite their closeness, there are a few significant differences between Calypso's historical contactless protocol and ISO/IEC 14443 Type B international standard.

The European standard for ticketing data (EN1545) has also been contributed to by the actors of Calypso.

After a few years of trials, the system was adopted throughout the early 2000s in major European cities such as Strasbourg, Paris, Venice, Lisbon, later followed by Turin, Porto, Marseille, Lyon, and many smaller cities. Calypso is now also used in other countries such as Belgium, Israel, Canada, Mexico, Colombia, etc.

== Technical aspects ==
Calypso is based on two main technologies:

- The microprocessor smartcard, widely used in many monetary transactions;
- The contactless interface (improperly called RFID) ensuring both remote powering and communication between the reader and the card.

A Calypso card, whatever its form (card, watch, mobile phone or other NFC object, etc.) has a microprocessor which contains all the information related to its owner rights for the application, and which implements the Calypso authentication scheme for security. This differentiates it from other e-ticketing system, such as London's Oyster card, where the card is only a memory chip with no processing capabilities.

== Calypso Networks Association ==
A non-for-profit association, Calypso Networks Association (CNA), has been created to group the transit network operators using Calypso, and the suppliers of their equipment, together. This association promotes the standard to new operators and manufacturers, defines the certification policy to guarantee the compatibility of all current and future products, and governs the evolution of the standard. This technical job is performed mainly by a subcontractor, Spirtech.

== See also ==
- CIPURSE, open security standard for transit fare collection systems by Open Standard for Public Transportation (OSPT) Alliance
- Watchdata provide their own OS TimeCOS® Calypso Prime, designed for transportation and multi-application, ready for multi-service and mobile. Ticketing across a wide range of platforms and environments, including multi-application and mobile. Supports an account-based ticketing scheme. Provides cross network and cross-border interoperability. Stores a number of contracts / different ticketing options
