= Jiagedaqi railway station =

Railway station in Heilongjiang, China

Coordinates: 50.4187°N 124.1187°E

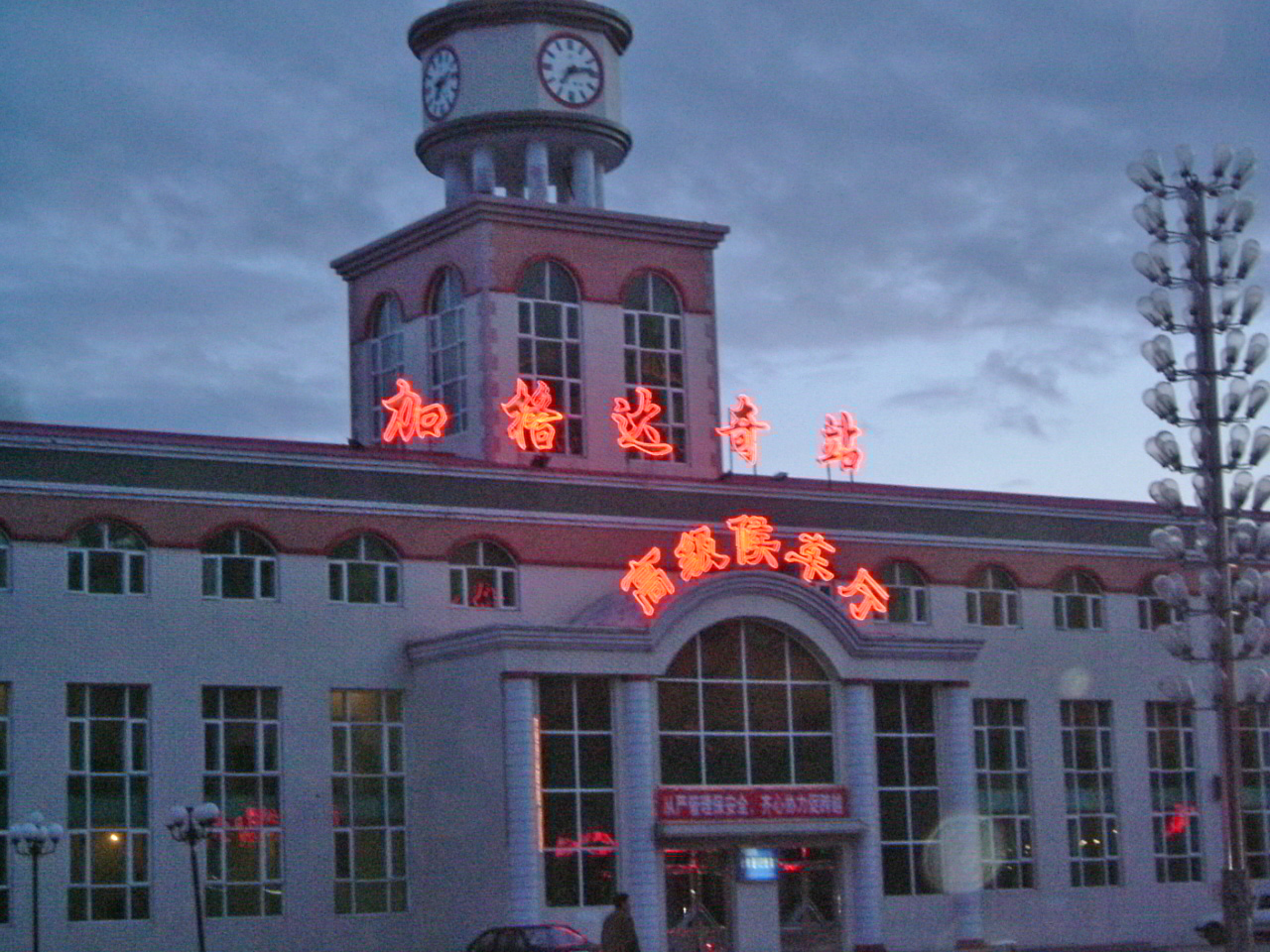
Jiagedaqi railway station in the evening

Jiagedaqi railway station is a railway station in Jiagedaqi District, Daxing'anling Prefecture. It is located on the Yitulihe–Jiagedaqi railway and Nenjiang–Greater Khingan Forest railway. It was founded in 1965.
