= Automated cash handling =

Process of managing cash within business

Automated cash handling is the process of dispensing, counting and tracking cash in a bank, retail, check cashing, payday loan / advance, casino or other business environment through specially designed hardware and software for the purposes of loss prevention, theft deterrence and reducing management time for oversight of cash drawer an unable operations.

Hardware for automated cash handling usually consists of one or more of the following devices:

- Automatic teller machine (ATM)
- Cash dispenser
- Cash validator (acceptor)
- Cash recycler
- Rolled coin dispenser
- Loose coin validator (counter)
- Intelligent banknote neutralization system

In an automated cash handling environment, a cashier or teller opens a cash drawer at the start of shift by dispensing cash from the automated cash handling equipment. At the end of the shift, the cashier or teller deposits cash into the automated cash handling equipment which counts the cash and deposits it back into the safe. A manager sets permissions for each teller or cashier for dispensing and counting cash. A few automated cash handling systems allow for networking and remote operation (dispensing, counting, reporting). Remote operation of automated cash handling equipment facilitates cost savings and efficiency by centralizing all cash-related activity to one location that can remotely monitor and control cash operations.

== Benefits of automated cash handling ==
The primary benefits of automated cash handling include:

- Manual labour is reduced
- Faster customer service
- Safer transactions with fewer person to person interaction
- Consistent reliability
- Cheaper and much more efficient than a hired employee

== Disadvantages ==
Disadvantages of automated cash handling include:

- Regular system maintenance in order to keep operating systems running
- The loss of certain jobs due to advanced automated cash handling systems that require little human interaction

== Role in economy ==
There are several different roles Automatic cash handling systems play in an everyday economy. With few setbacks these systems do much more than dispense money, read checks, transfer money through bank accounts, etc. Automatic cash handling systems are now found in prisons to help inmates' relatives transfer money to prisoners. This process is done electronically and is much more efficient and faster than previously manual money transfers. These systems also help prisoners psyche by dissuading prisoners from committing fraud or stealing money. In 1987 automated cash handling systems started to become a favourite among retailers nationwide. The effectiveness and quick checkouts by customers encouraged to use debit/credit cards, acted as an attractant for customers. It would not be long until most businesses had installed automated cash handling systems as way to keep customers satisfied. In states such as Oregon and New Jersey, where pumping your own gas is outlawed, automated cash handling has played an important role as a crime deterrent and economical sound system. Gas attendants now do not have to worry about being robbed. With automated cash systems in place at these gas stations, everything is used by computer, making transactions faster than ever. These systems also allow petroleum companies to save money and ensure a higher level of security.

== Effect on banking jobs ==
Automated cash systems have been changing the way society operates since becoming popular in the 1980s. Banks have evolved the way they operate around these advanced systems. Bankers are finding themselves less physically dealing with money; rather, they are finding themselves more in a sales position than a traditional banker who handles money. These automated systems now count most of the money and dispense the proper amount to bankers.

== See also ==
- Automated teller machine
- Teller Assist Unit
- Banknote
- Banknote counter
- Currency-counting machine
- Currency detector
- Manual fare collection
